= South Eastern Railway Colony =

South Eastern Railway Colony BNR BNR Colony
- Neighbourhood in Kolkata (Calcutta)
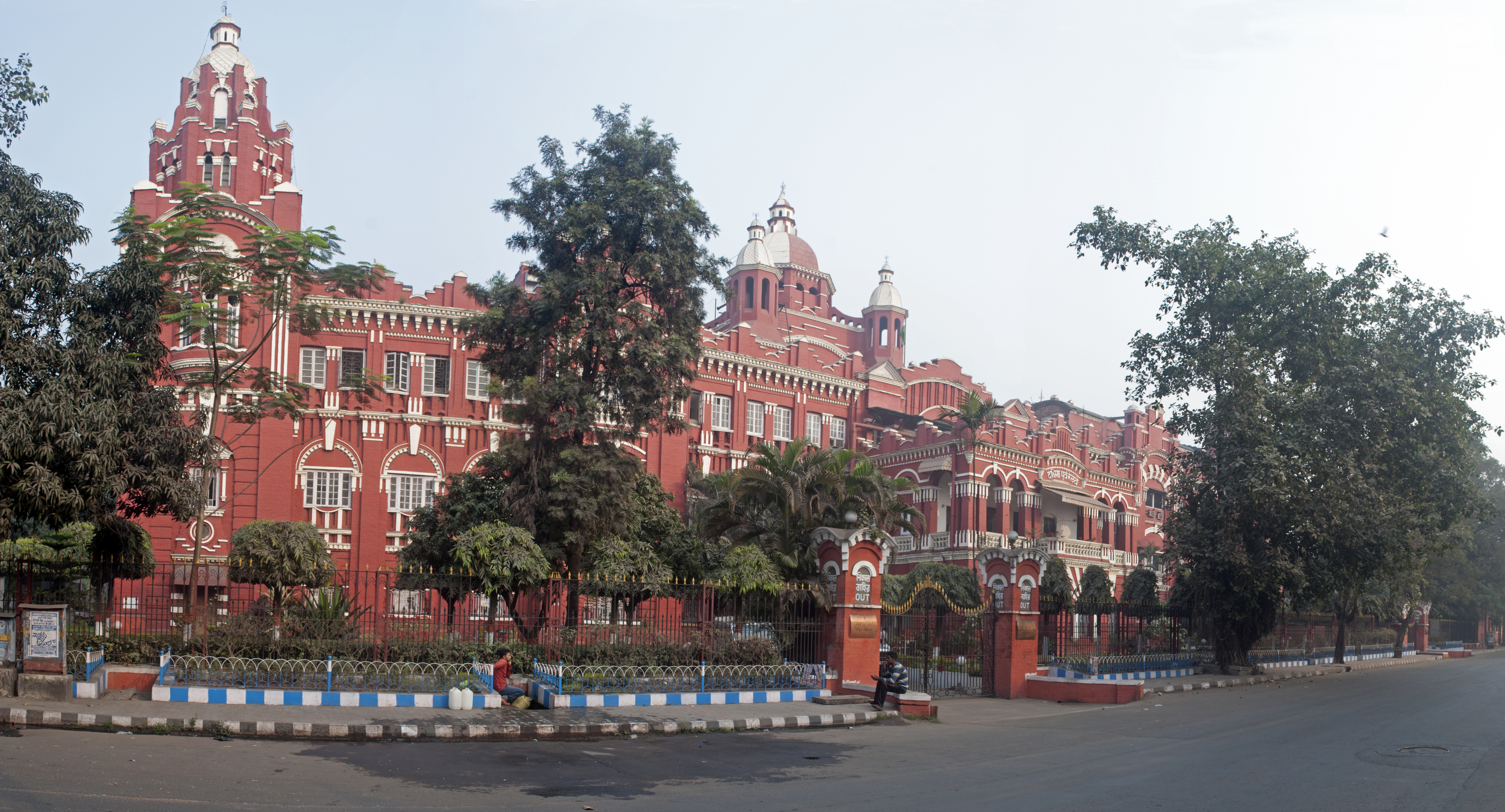
- Headquarter of the South Eastern Railway

- Location in Kolkata
- Coordinates: 22°32′36″N 88°18′34″E
- Country: India
- State: West Bengal
- City: Kolkata
- District: Kolkata
- Parliamentary constituency: Kolkata Dakshin
- Assembly constituency: Kolkata Port
- Municipal Corporation: Kolkata Municipal Corporation
- KMC ward: 79, 80
- Time zone: UTC+5:30 (IST)
- PIN: 700043
- Area code: +91 33

South Eastern Railway Colony (also known as BNR Colony) popularly known as BNR, is a locality in the Garden Reach neighbourhood of Kolkata, the capital of the Indian state of West Bengal.

== Transport ==
Garden Reach Road passes through BNR Colony. The road is connected to Karl Marx Sarani via Dumayne Avenue and Ram Surat Singh Road.

=== Private Bus ===
- 1 Ramnagar - Mukundapur
- 1A Ramnagar -Mukundapur
- 12 Rajabagan - Esplanade/Rajabazar
- 12A Rajabagan - Howrah Station
- 12B Rajabagan - Esplanade
- 12C Pailan - Howrah Station
- 227 BNR Colony - Sreebhumi

=== Train ===
Khiddirpur railway station on the Kolkata Circular Railway line is the nearest railway station.

== See also ==
- Garden Reach
