= Vinod Kumar Mehta =

Indian police officer

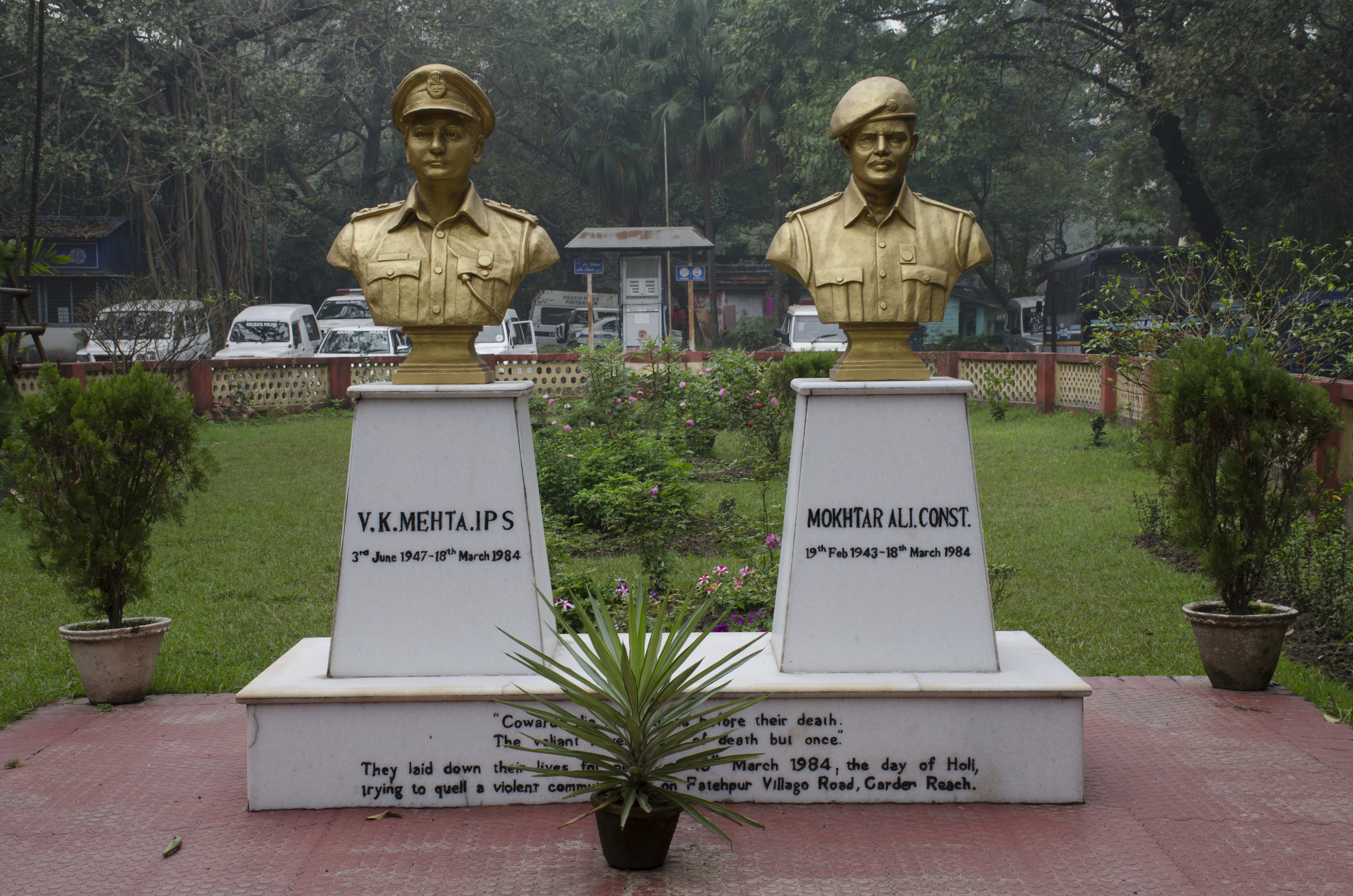
Statue of Vinod Kumar Mehta and Mokthar Ali at the office of the deputy commissioner of Police. port division

Vinod Kumar Mehta was an IPS officer who served in the Kolkata Police as the Deputy Commissioner of Police at the time of his murder in 1984. He with his body guard Mokhtar Ali were murdered on 18 March 1984 in Garden Reach. The prime suspect Idris Ali died in police custody.
