= Kolkata biryani =

Indian rice dish

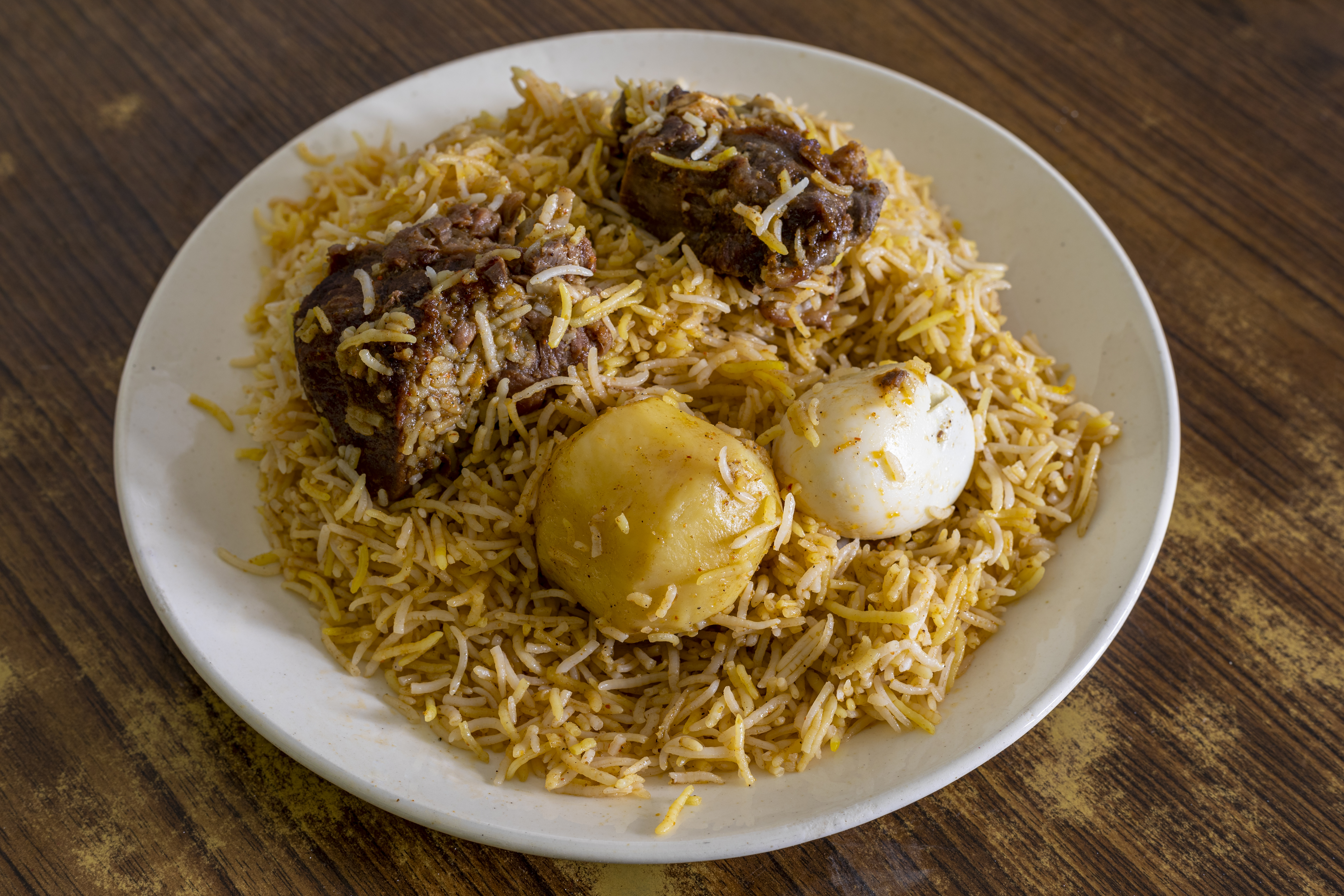
- Kolkata biryani with two pieces of mutton (goat meat), an egg and a potato.
- Place of origin: India
- Region or state: Kolkata
- Main ingredients: Basmati rice; Goat meat; Chicken; Vegetables; Spices

Kolkata biryani (Bengali: কোলকাতা বিরিয়ানি) is a spicy rice-based dish, a local tradition originating from Mughlai cuisine. The name of the dish comes from the city of Kolkata in West Bengal. Rice is used as the base ingredient, and meat, eggs, potatoes and spices are added. It is best known for its use of potatoes, and is famous for its light blend of spices.

Although there is uncertainty about the exact origin of biryani, it is believed to have originated in Iran. Historians and experts agree that the dish known as modern day "Biryani" was invented in Delhi during the Mughal period. The Kolkata style of Biryani was invented in the 1850s and 1860s.

Kolkata biryani is very popular in the city of Kolkata and its suburbs, also popular throughout West Bengal outside the Kolkata metropolitan region.

== History of origin ==
The Kolkata biryani originated in the kitchen of Nawab Wajid Ali Shah during his exile in Calcutta, after he was dethroned by the British East India Company in 1856. Biryani was one of his favourite cuisines. But for being in exile, he faced severe financial problems. To cut the costs, the amount of spices were decreased and the meat-to-rice ratio was lowered in the biryani. Hence, the new biryani prepared, was much subtle and lighter in texture compared to the Lucknow biryani. Since meat was expensive, the cooks added large chunks of potatoes to fill the void created by lowered number of meat chunks. Over time, as biryani became popular among the masses, potato became a signature ingredient of the Kolkata biryani.

Few sources suggest a different reason behind the presence of potato in the Kolkata biryani. In the early 16th century, potatoes, chillies and tomatoes were cultivated for the first time in India by the Portuguese. Potatoes were mainly cultivated in Surat, but since the cultivation was low and it was not easily available, potatoes were considered as an exotic vegetable. During Nawab Wajid Ali Shah's exile in Metiabruz, Calcutta, the chefs added potato to biryani as an experiment. Nawab liked the potato cooked with saffron spices and henceforth, potato was always added whenever biryani was prepared. The nobles also loved potato when royal biryani was served to them. At their homes, they asked their wives to add potatoes whenever biryani was prepared and over time, potatoes became an intangible part of the Kolkata biryani.

== Bibliography ==
- Srividya, V. (15 November 2017). Tracing the Trails of the Nawabi Dish – Biryani (Technical report). University of Delhi.
- Pal, Dr. Arghya (2022). Tracing the Trails of the Nawabi Dish – Biryani (Technical report). All India Institute of Medical Sciences, Raebareli.
