= Garden Reach Flyover =

Flyover in Kolkata, West Bengal, India

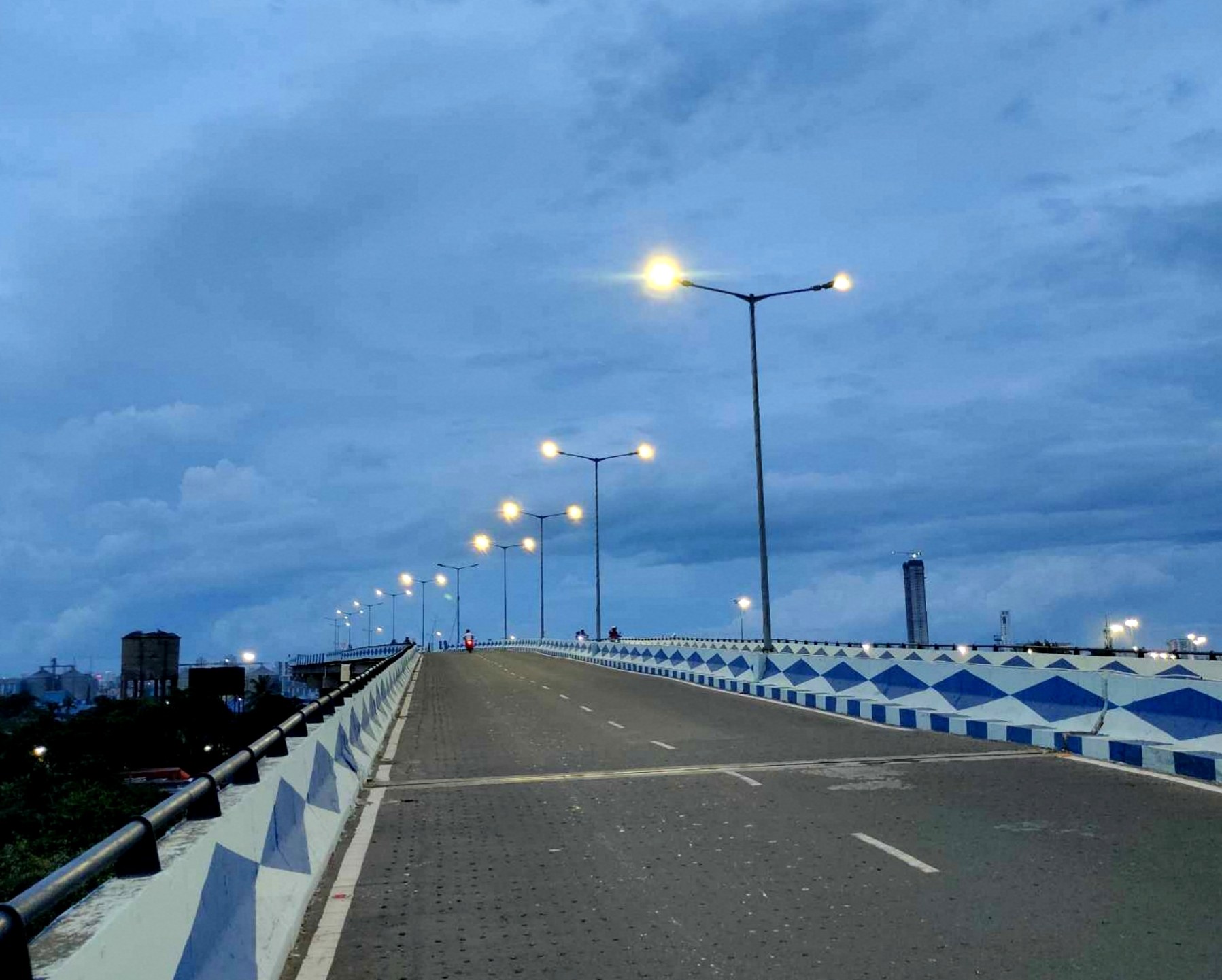
- Coordinates: 22.5257°N 88.3068°E
- Carries: Bikes, cars
- Locale: Kolkata, West Bengal, India india

Characteristics
- Material: Steel, Concrete
- Total length: 4.4 kilometres (2.7 mi)

History
- Construction start: 2014
- Construction end: 2018
- Opened: 9 Mar 2018; 8 years ago

Statistics
- Toll: No

Location
- Interactive map of Garden Reach Flyover

The Garden Reach Flyover is a flyover connecting the Garden Reach area and Majherhat in the port area of South Kolkata. The 4.4 kilometres (2.7 mi) long and four-lane flyover was inaugurated by Chief Minister of West Bengal Mamata Banerjee on 9 March 2018. Flyover connecting Brooklyn crossing, close to Ramnagar at the Garden Reach end and terminating near Majherhat railway station. The four-lane flyover that has been set up by the Kolkata Metropolitan Development Authority (KMDA) at a cost of Rs 340 crore.

== Background ==
Khidirpur and Garden Reach are two of the crowded areas of Kolkata. For being densely populated, traffic is one of the major problems in the region. The main cause of the traffic is the large trailers and trucks entering and exiting the port area. Patients often have to get stuck in this traffic. Residents have long been demanding the construction of a flypool to relieve the suffering.

Chief Minister Mamata Banerjee at a ceremony in Khidirpur in the morning, witnessed a severe traffic congestion on Garden Reach Road. The road is the main route to Khidirpur. At that time, MLA and Urban Development Minister Firhad Hakim had proposed to the Chief Minister to construct a flyover. The Chief Minister also agreed immediately.

== History ==
Construction of this four-lane flyover began in February 2014. The work was supposed to be completed in August 2016. Due to land problems, the work is often delayed. Finally, it was decided that the flyover would be launched by July 2017.

The Kolkata Metropolitan Development Authority (KMDA) was appointed for the construction of the flyover. A Central Government firm RITES was appointed to prepare a Detailed Project Report (DPR). West Bengal government approved INR 339 crore for the construction of the flyover. The Kolkata Port Authority gave the land.
