= Badartala =

- Neighbourhood in Kolkata (Calcutta)
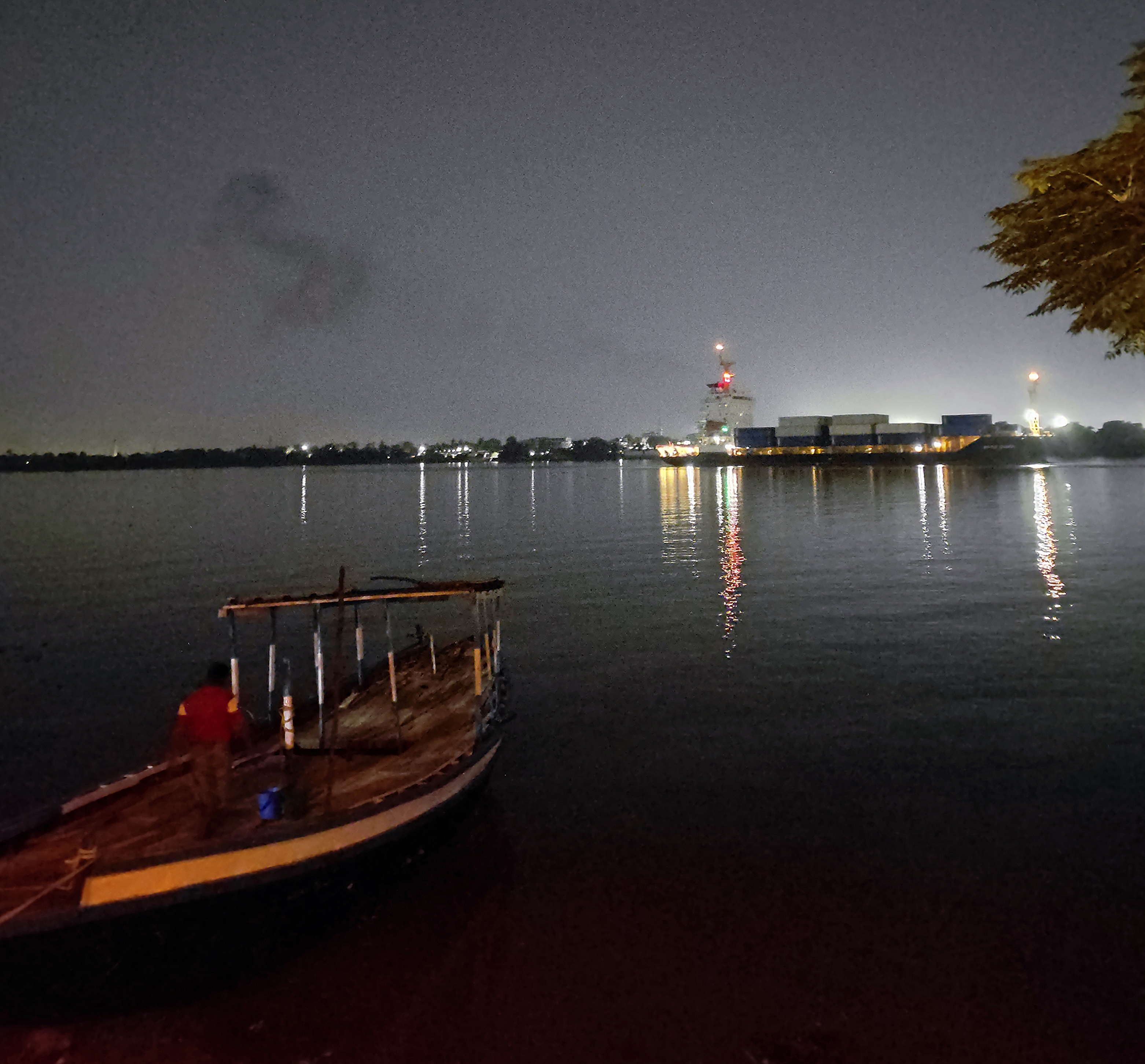
- View of Hooghly river from Birju Nala Rd

- Location in Kolkata
- Coordinates: 22.555517°N 88.268056°E
- Country: India
- State: West Bengal
- City: Kolkata
- District: Kolkata
- Municipal corporation: Kolkata Municipal Corporation
- KMC ward: 141
- Time zone: UTC+5:30 (IST)
- PIN: 700044
- Area code: +91 33
- Lok Sabha constituency: Diamond Harbour
- Vidhan Sabha constituency: Metiaburuz

Badartala is a suburb locality of South West Kolkata in West Bengal, India. It is situated in the south-western fringes of Kolkata near the bank of Hooghly River. Adjoined neighbourhoods are Rajabagan (east), Metiabruz (south east) and Akra Phatak (south). Ayub Nagar Basti, Kanchantala, Bagdipara, Nadial, Birjunala, Jeliapara, Kachari Bari, Waris Nagar, are some sub localities of the neighborhood.

== Geography ==
=== Police district ===
Nadial police station is part of the Port division of Kolkata Police. It is located at 2-3/102 Dr. A.K.Road, Kolkata-700044.

Watgunge Women police station, located at 16, Watgunge Street, Kolkata-700023, covers all police districts under the jurisdiction of the Port division i.e. North Port, South Port, Watgunge, West Port, Garden Reach, Ekbalpur, Nadial, Rajabagan and Metiabruz.

Jadavpur, Thakurpukur, Behala, Purba Jadavpur, Tiljala, Regent Park, Metiabruz, Nadial and Kasba police stations were transferred from South 24 Parganas to Kolkata in 2011. Except Metiabruz, all the police stations were split into two. The new police stations are Parnasree, Haridevpur, Garfa, Patuli, Survey Park, Pragati Maidan, Bansdroni and Rajabagan.

=== Post office ===
Badartala post office is located near Badartala High School at Dr. Abdul Khabir Road.

== Educational institutions ==
Badartala is slowly growing ahead in educational field. There is no college available for the matric passed students in their area. Students need to travel for college study.

== Public transport ==
Transport is poor in the area. It is not connected well with other parts of the city by bus or any other type of transport. There is a private bus service no. 12 which goes to Esplanade via Metiabruz, Garden Reach, Kidderpore and Hastings.

== Health and medical facilities ==
The area has a government hospital named Garden Reach State General Hospital with previously having poor arrangement and facilities. The government haS taken certain measures and reconstructed the hospital in a large one with a good facilities. It shares its premises with the Nadial police station of the area.

== Kolkata honour killing (2012) ==
On 7 December 2012, a man beheaded his younger sister in public, with a sword. He then walked to the Nadial police station with his sister's head and the sword. Scores of residents looked on in horror as he walked to a police station with the head in his left hand and the sword in his right, dripping blood all along the way. The police said the man asked to be charged and that he confessed to killing his sister for an extra-marital relationship.
