= Harimohan Ghose College =

College in West Bengal

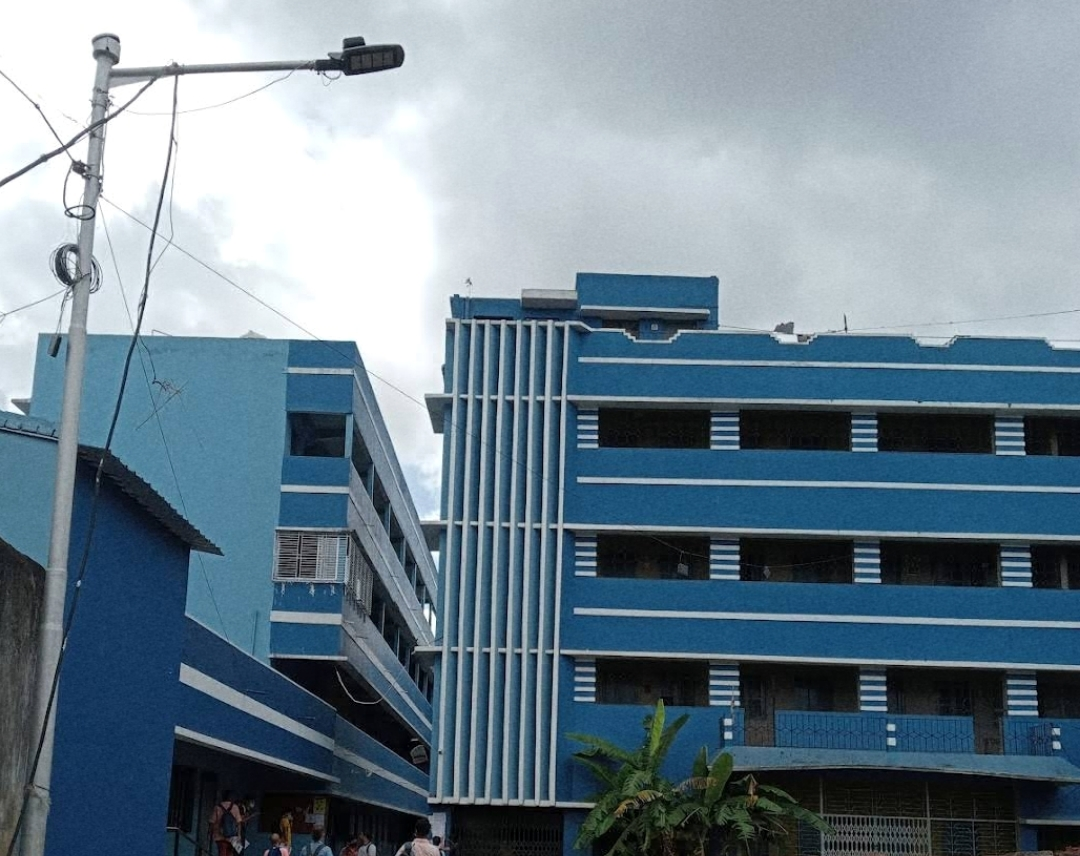
- Motto: From Darkness To Light And More Light
- Type: Undergraduate college
- Established: 1963; 63 years ago
- Affiliations: University of Calcutta
- Location: J/206, Paharpur Rd, Roy Para, Garden reach, Kolkata, West Bengal, 700024, India; 22.5421969°N 88.2867292°E
- Campus: Urban
- Website: Harimohan Ghose College
- Location within Kolkata Location within India

Harimohan Ghose College is an undergraduate college in Garden Reach, Kolkata. It is affiliated to the University of Calcutta. It was established in the year 1963.

== Departments ==
=== Science ===
- Chemistry
- Physics
- Mathematics
- Physiology
- Botany
- Physical Education

=== Arts and Commerce ===
- Bengali
- English
- Urdu
- History
- Political Science
- Economics
- Education
- Commerce

== Accreditation ==
Harimohan Ghose College is recognized by the University Grants Commission (UGC).

== Auditorium ==
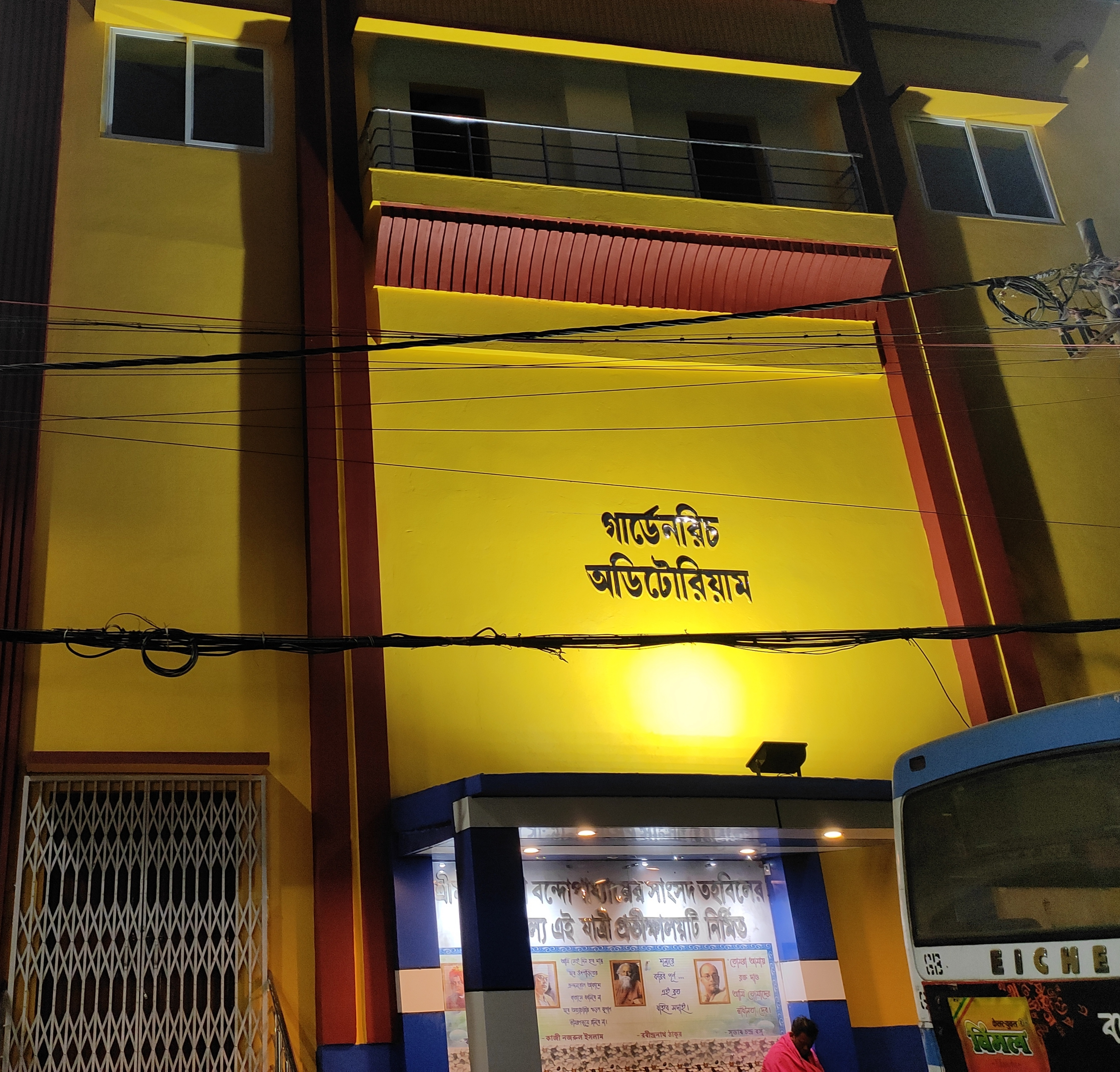
Garden Reach Auditorium

== Death of police officer ==
In 2015, The Telegraph reported that the college had struggled to appoint a principal, following the 2013 shooting of a police officer outside the school.

On 11 February 2013 a police officer, Tapas Choudhury, was shot dead as members of the students' wings of Indian National Congress and Trinamool Congress violently clashed at Harimohan Ghose College while filling the nomination papers for the students' union election. Four students were injured in the violence.

== Notable alumni ==
- Biman Banerjee

== See also ==
- Garden reach
- List of colleges affiliated to the University of Calcutta
- Education in India
- Education in West Bengal
