= Rajabagan =

- Neighbourhood in Kolkata (Calcutta)
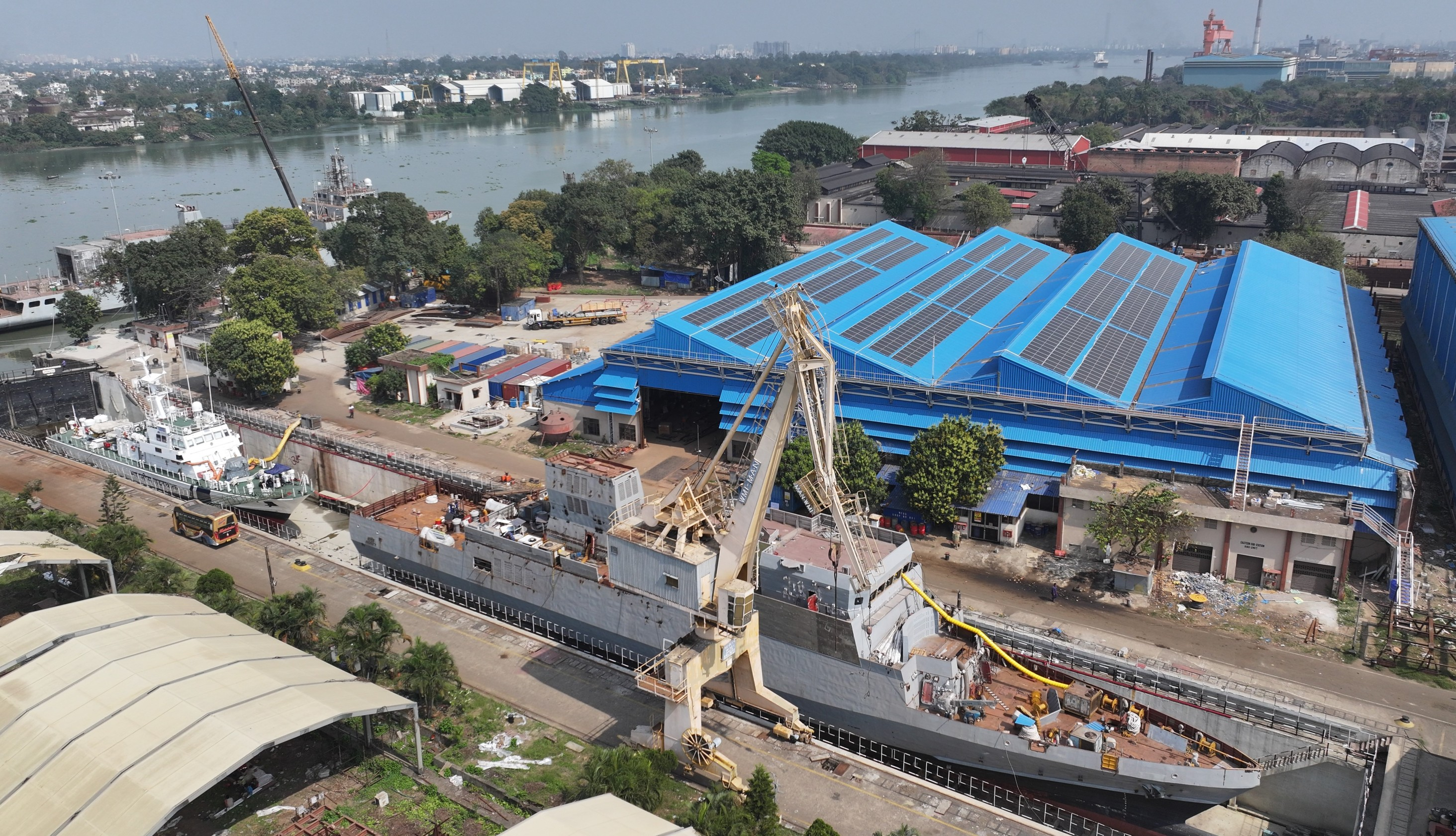
- Rajabagan Dockyard

- Location in Kolkata
- Coordinates: 22.553417°N 88.269556°E
- Country: India
- State: West Bengal
- City: Kolkata
- District: Kolkata
- Municipal corporation: Kolkata Municipal Corporation
- KMC ward: 141

Population
  - Total: For population see linked KMC ward page
- Time zone: UTC+5:30 (IST)
- PIN: 700 044
- Area code: +91 33
- Lok Sabha constituency: Diamond Harbour
- Vidhan Sabha constituency: Metiaburuz

Rajabagan is a locality and a dockyard in the Garden Reach neighbourhood of Kolkata in West Bengal, India. It is situated in the south-western part of Kolkata near the bank of the Hooghly river and is situated between Metiabruz (east) and Badartala (west).

== Geography ==
=== Post Office ===
The Post Office of the area is named Rajabagan Dock Yard with the Pin code 700044.

=== Police district ===
Rajabagan police station is part of the Port division of Kolkata Police. It is located at T-250 Garden Reach Road, Kolkata-700044.

Watgunge Women police station, located at 16, Watgunge Street, Kolkata-700023, covers all police districts under the jurisdiction of the Port division i.e. North Port, South Port, Watgunge, West Port, Garden Reach, Ekbalpur, Nadial, Rajabagan and Metiabruz.

Jadavpur, Thakurpukur, Behala, Purba Jadavpur, Tiljala, Regent Park, Metiabruz, Nadial and Kasba police stations were transferred from South 24 Parganas to Kolkata in 2011. Except Metiabruz, all the police stations were split into two. The new police stations are Parnasree, Haridevpur, Garfa, Patuli, Survey Park, Pragati Maidan, Bansdroni and Rajabagan.

== Economy ==
- Rajabagan Dockyard is a shipyard situated on the left bank of the Hooghly River about three nautical miles down stream of Calcutta Dock System. In 1967 it came into control of Central Inland Water Transport Corporation (CIWTC). However due to heavy losses it came under management of Garden Reach Shipbuilders & Engineers (GRSE) on 1 July 2006.
