= Garden Reach =

- Neighbourhood in Kolkata (Calcutta)
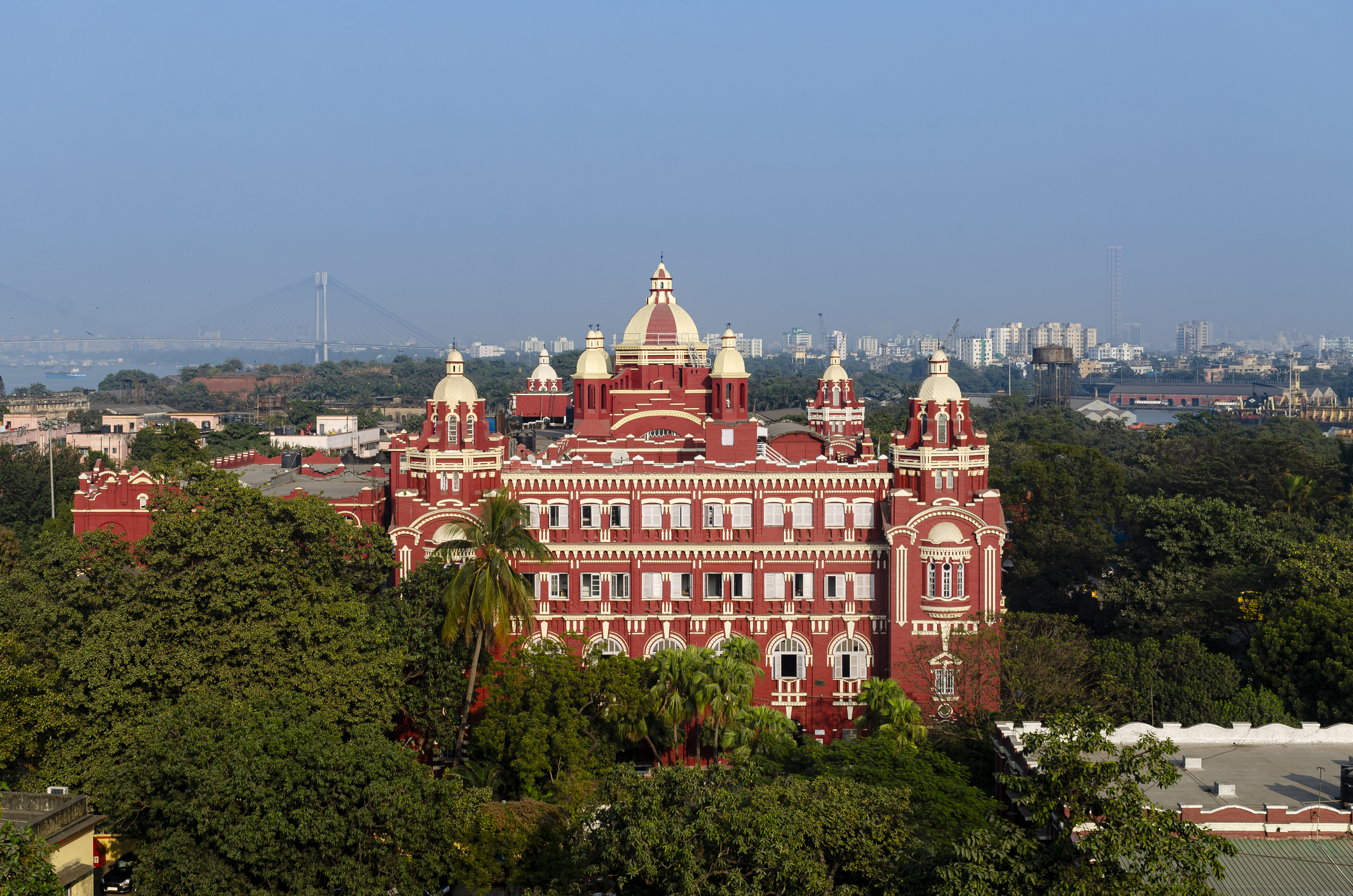
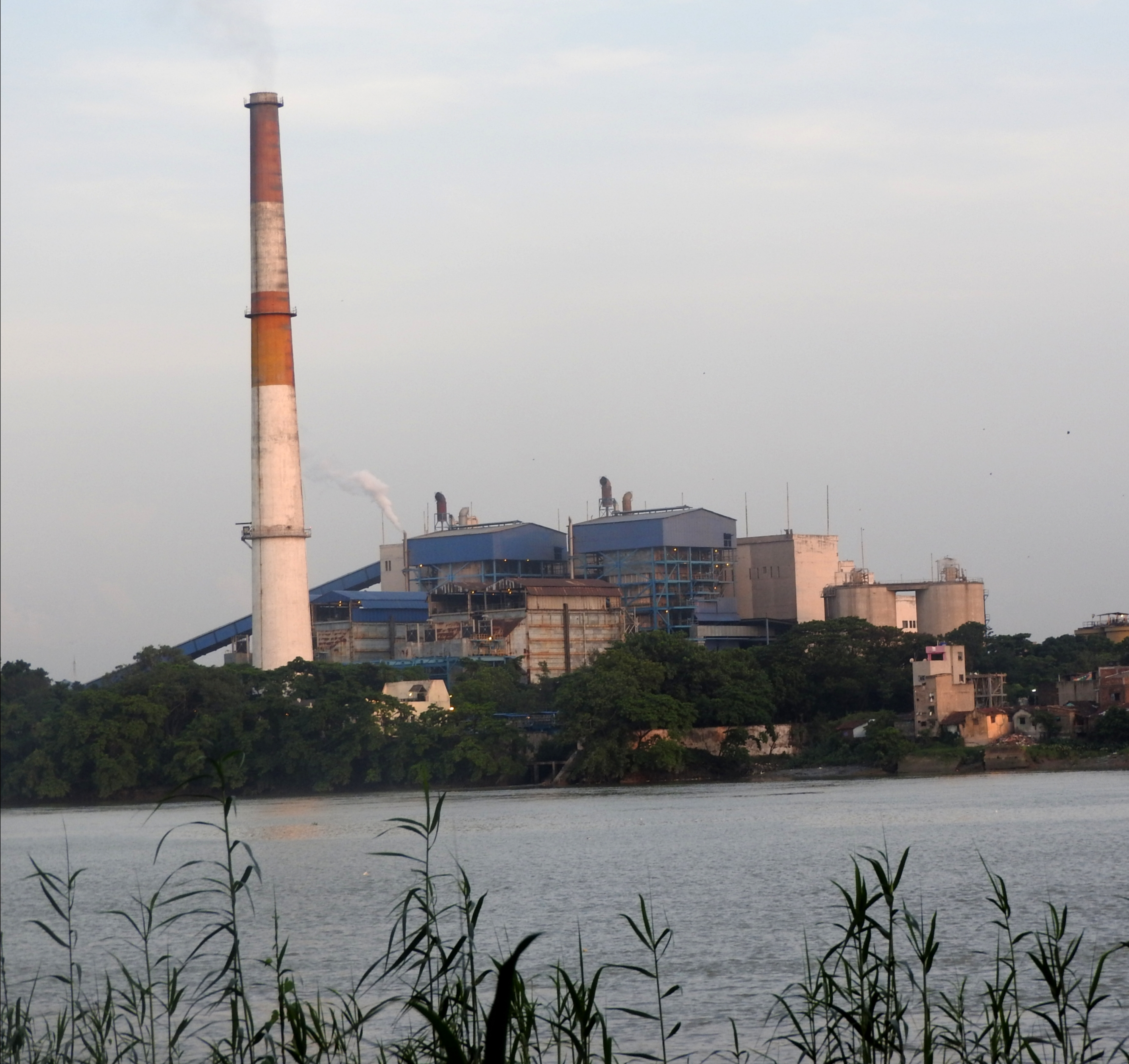
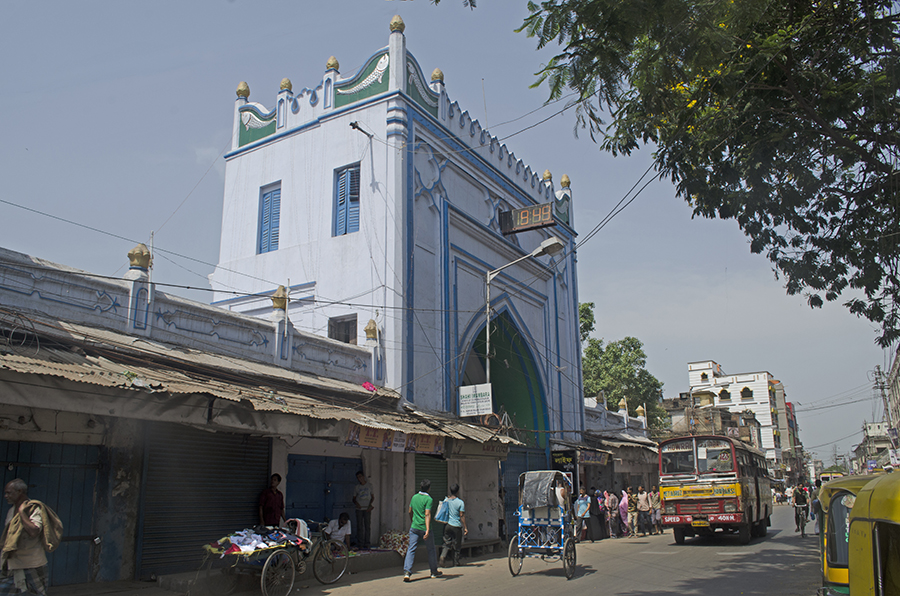
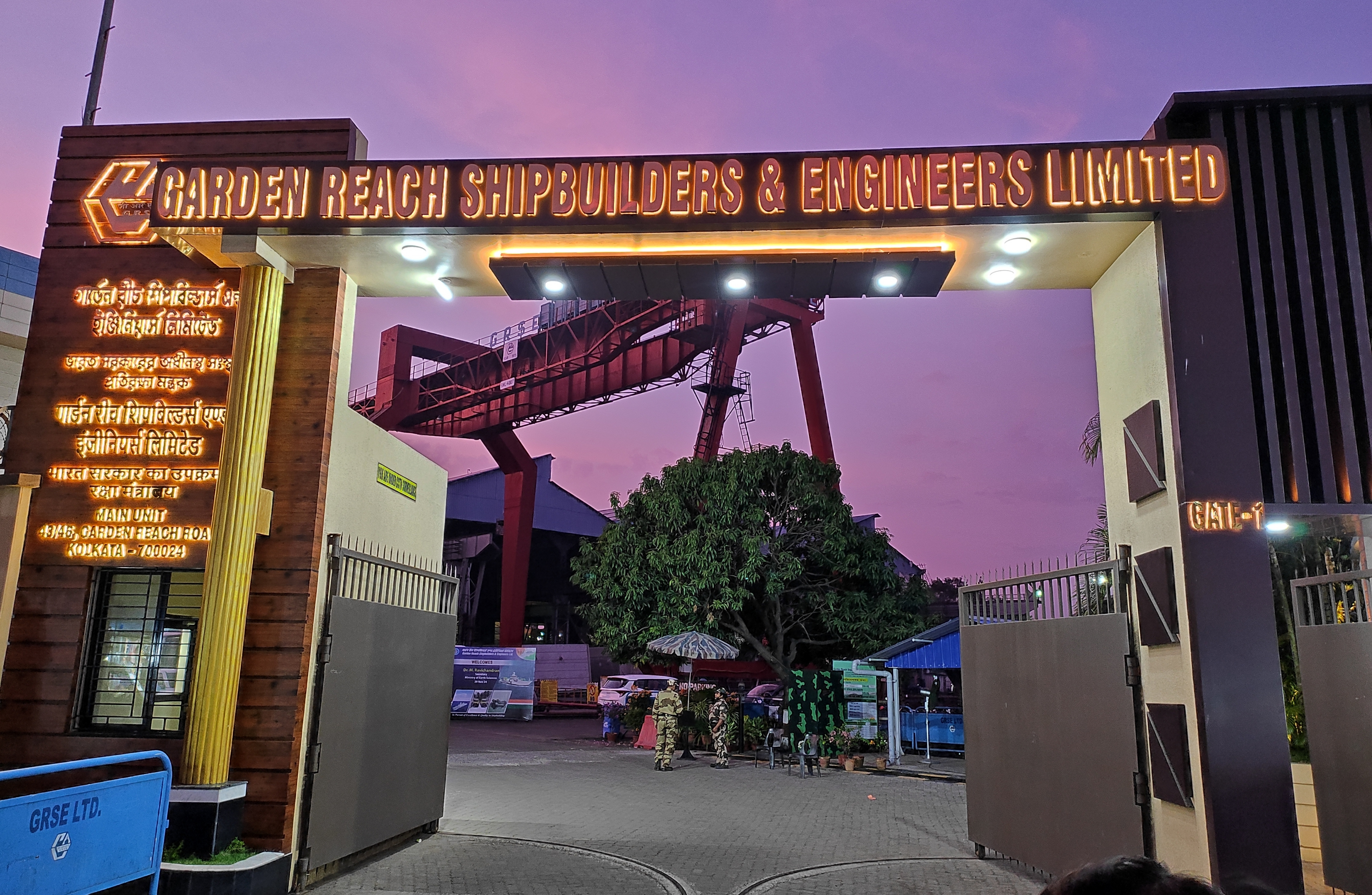
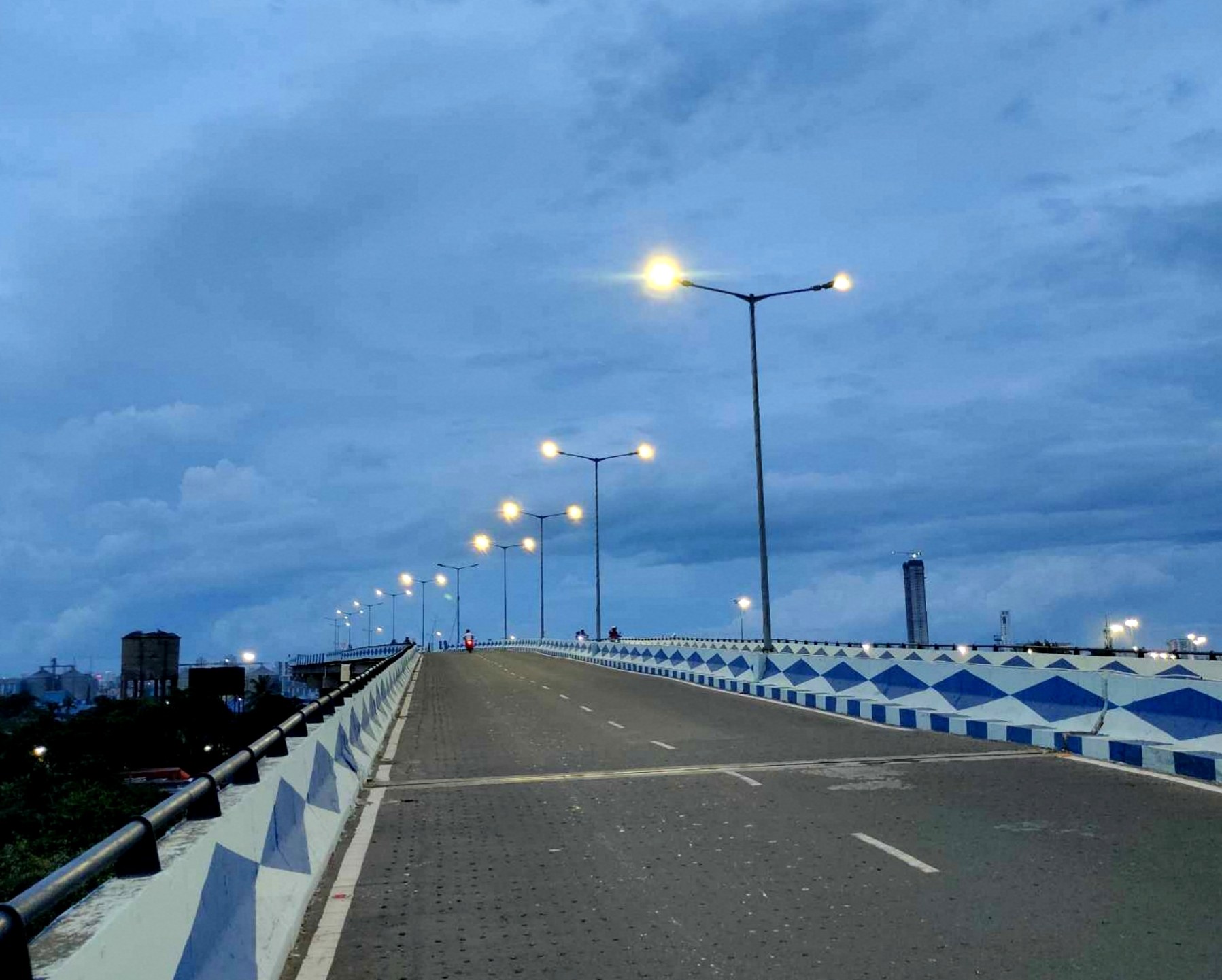
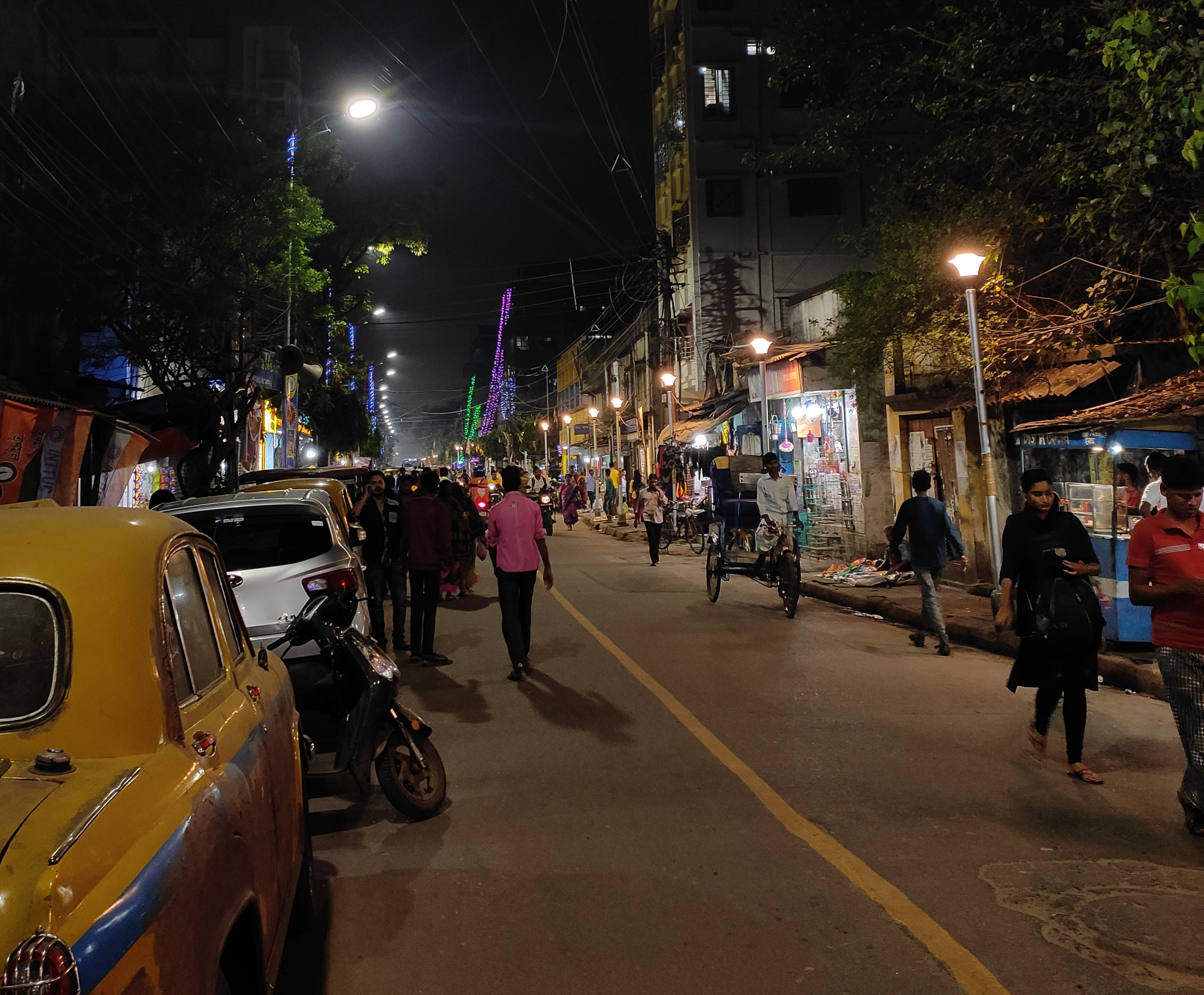
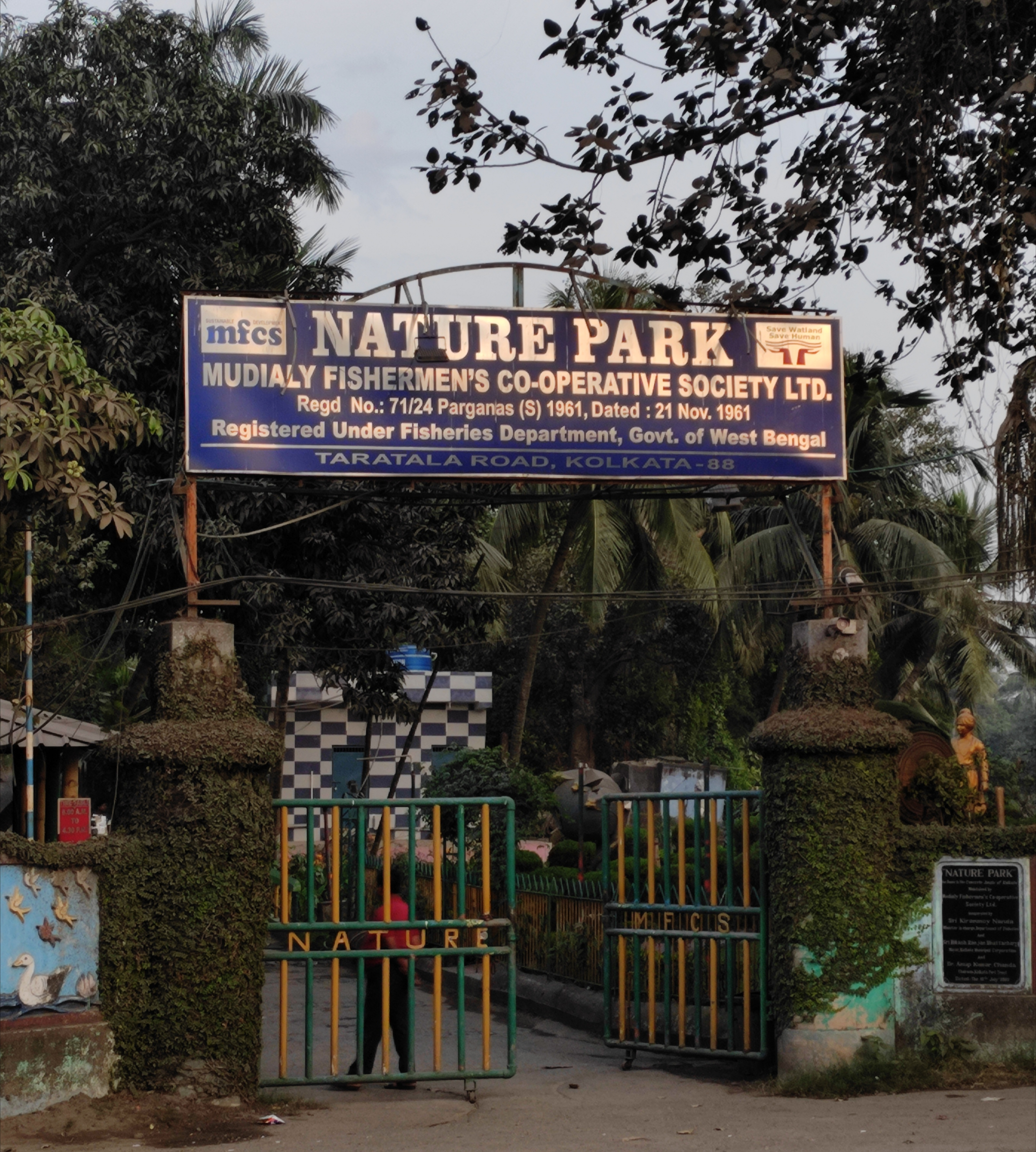
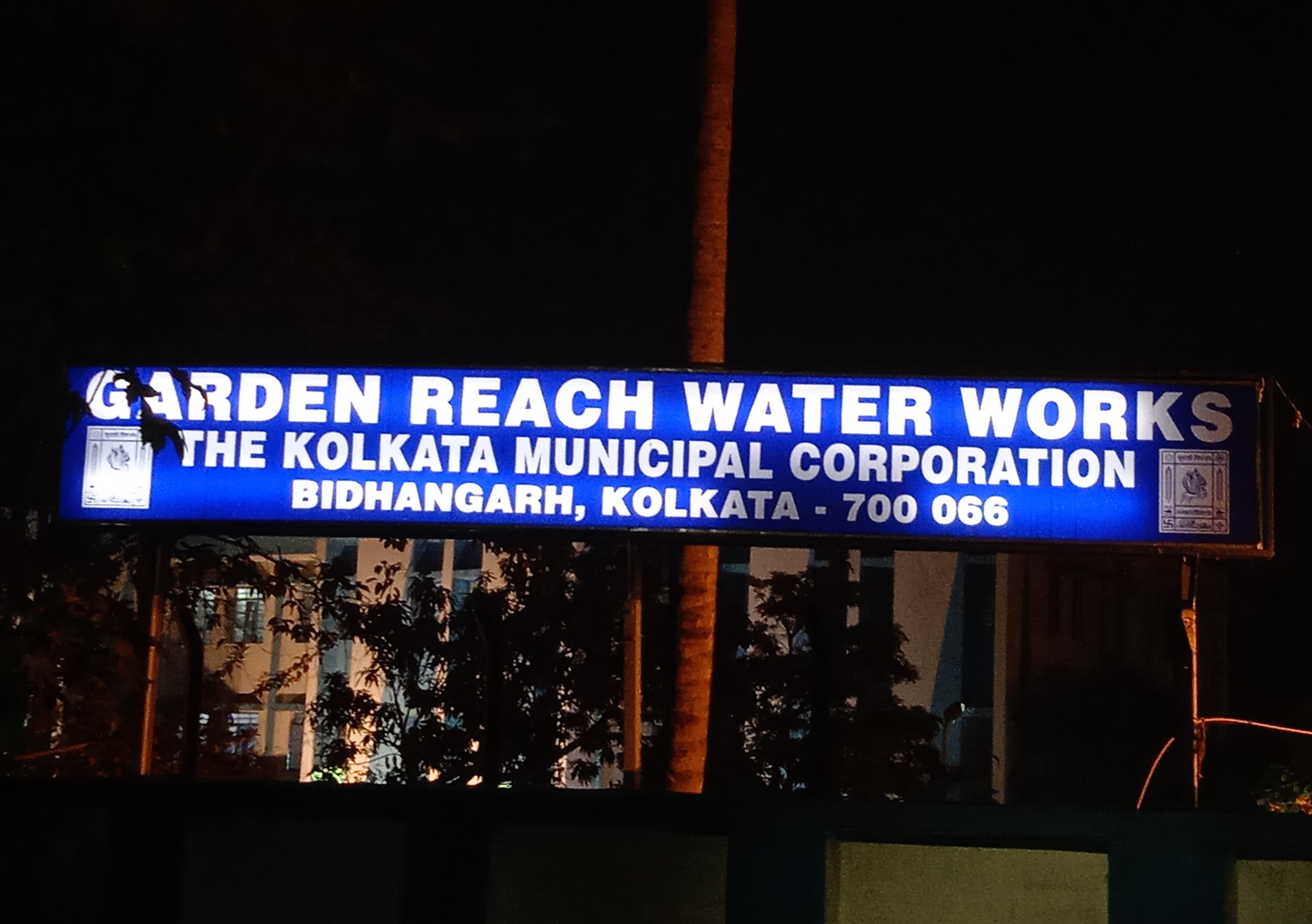
- South Eastern Railway Headquarters, BNR Southern Generating Station CESC Shahi Imambara of Nawab Wajid Ali Shah Garden Reach Shipbuilders & Engineers Garden Reach Flyover Paharpur Road Nature Park Garden Reach Water Works

- Location in Kolkata
- Coordinates: 22.5432°N 88.2942°E
- Country: India
- State: West Bengal
- City: Kolkata
- District: Kolkata
- Kolkata Suburban Railway: Santoshpur railway station
- Municipal Corporation: Kolkata Municipal Corporation
- KMC wards: 79, 80, 133, 134, 135, 136, 137, 138, 139, 140, 141
- Time zone: UTC+5:30 (IST)
- PIN: 700018, 700024, 700043, 700044, 700066, 700088
- Area code: +91 33
- Lok Sabha constituency: Kolkata Dakshin and Diamond Harbour
- Vidhan Sabha constituency: Kolkata Port and Metiaburuz

Garden Reach is a neighbourhood of Kolkata in West Bengal, India. It is situated in the south-western part of Kolkata on the eastern banks of the Hooghly River. Localities within Garden Reach include Metiabruz, BNR Colony, Bandhabartala, Bartala, Badartala, Rajabagan and Santoshpur.

== History ==
=== Nawab Wajid Ali Shah in Exile ===
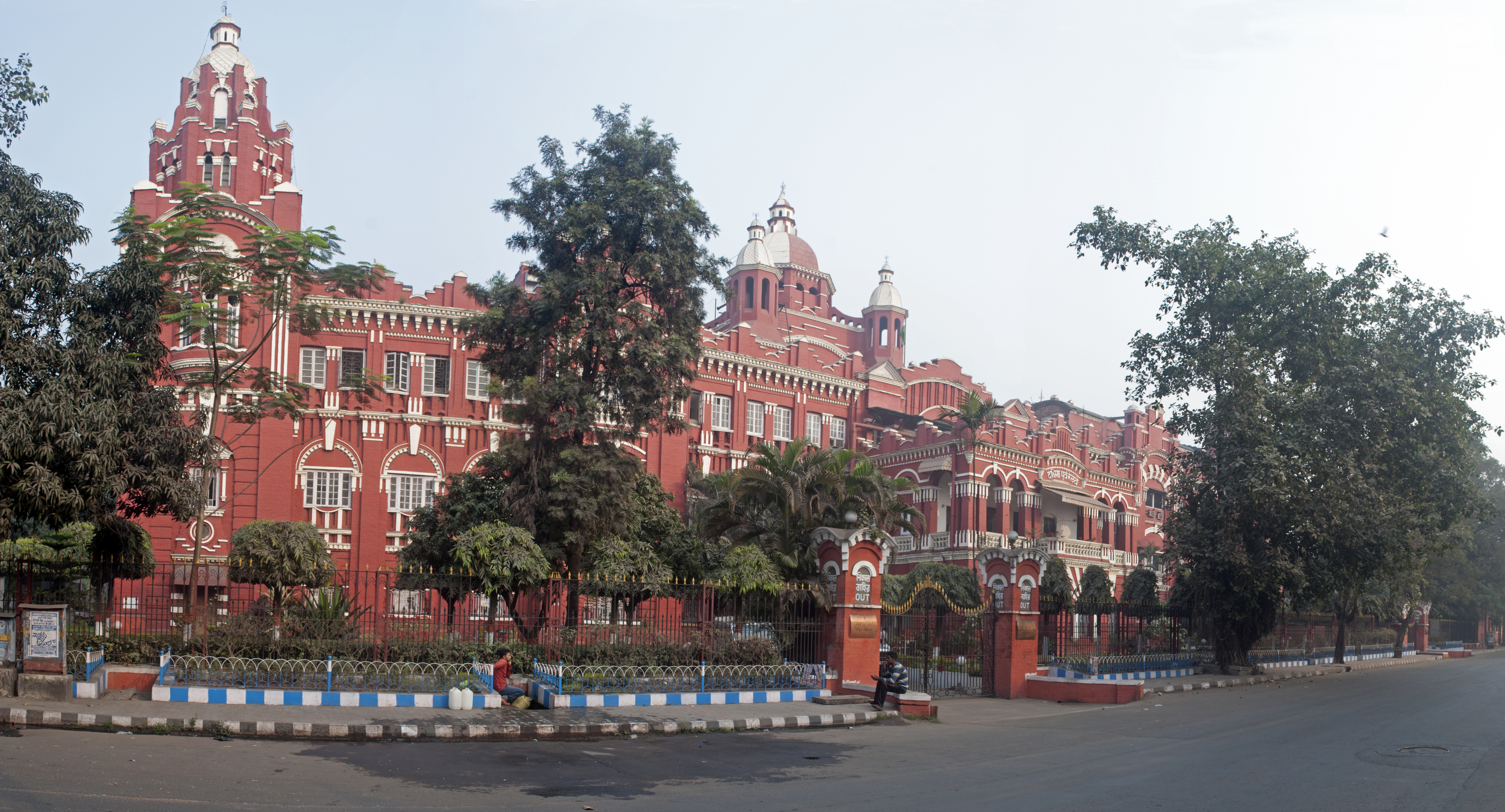
South Eastern Railway Headquarters

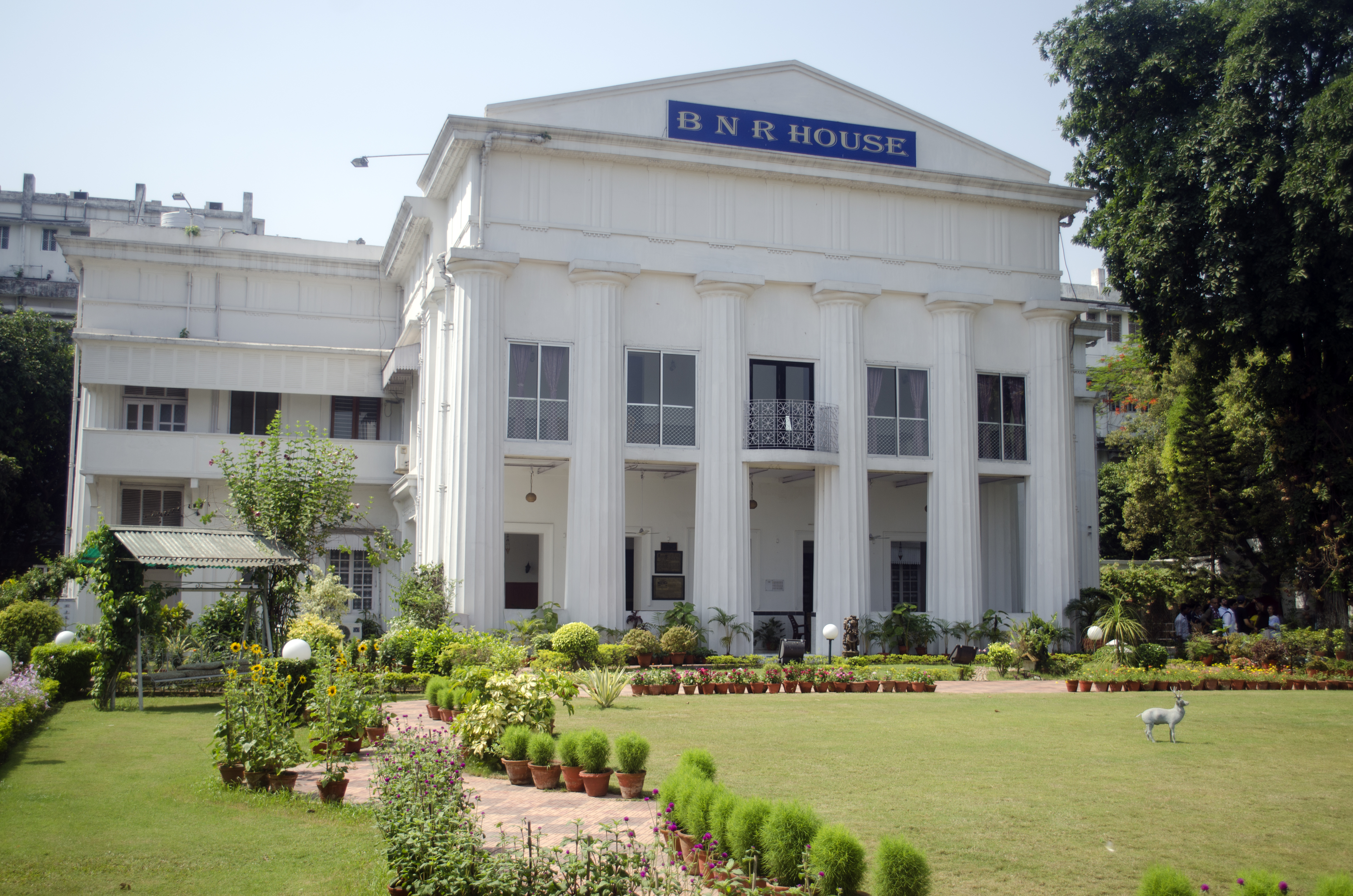
BNR House, S.E Railway Colony

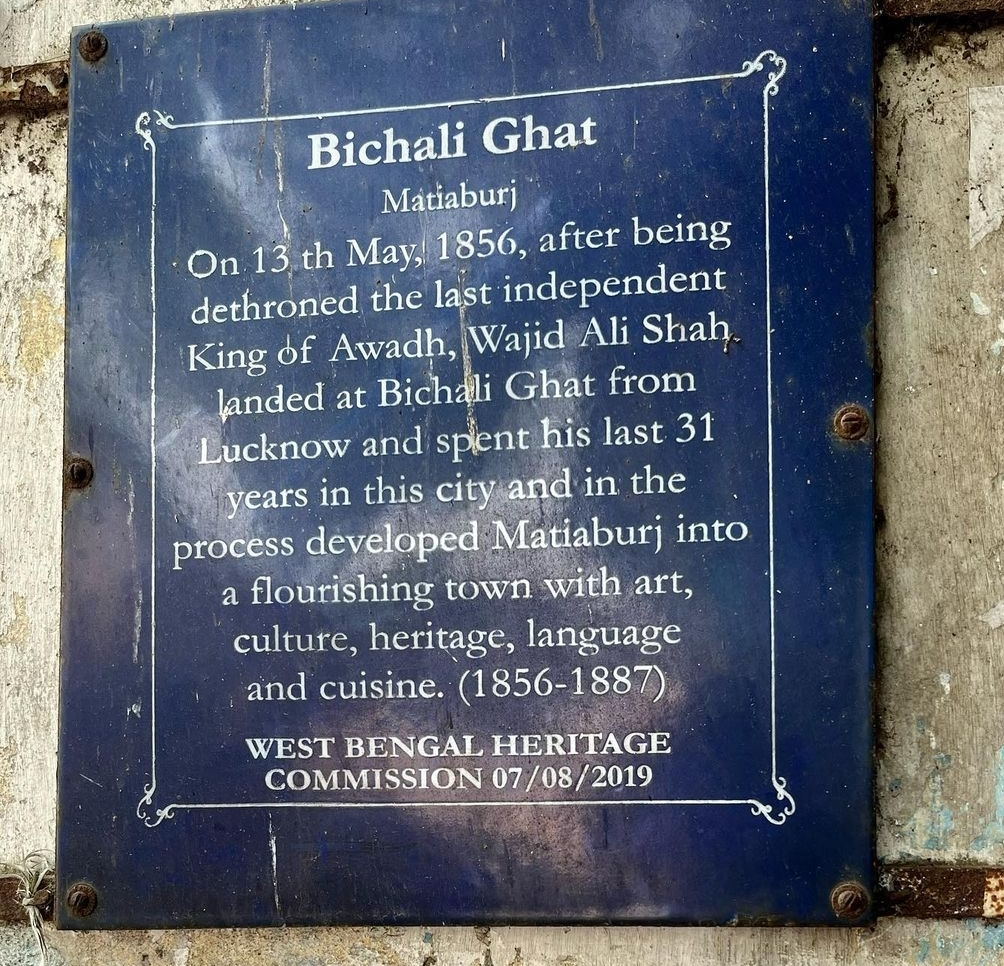
Bichali Ghat (Metiabruz Ferry Ghat)

This area is connected to the history of Nawab Wajid Ali Shah, eleventh and last King of Oudh, who after being ousted by the East India Company, made Garden Reach his refuge. Accompanied by his close relatives, musicians, cooks and animals from his menagerie, he came ashore at Bichali Ghat near Metiabruz on 13 May 1856. A year later when the Indian Rebellion of 1857 spread to Lucknow and the rebelling sepoys installed one of his sons to the throne of Awadh, Wajid Ali Shah was imprisoned in Fort William by the East India Company along with his Prime Minister, due to the fear that he could become a rallying figure for the rebellion. H.E.A. Cotton wrote that "on Panic Sunday (June 14, 1857), there was wide spread apprehension among the white inhabitants of Kolkata because he had one, two, three thousand (no one knew) armed men under him". After his release from Fort William, he was "allotted" a building called BNR House, in Garden Reach-BNR Colony area, now a part of headquarters of South-Eastern Railway, Kolkata.

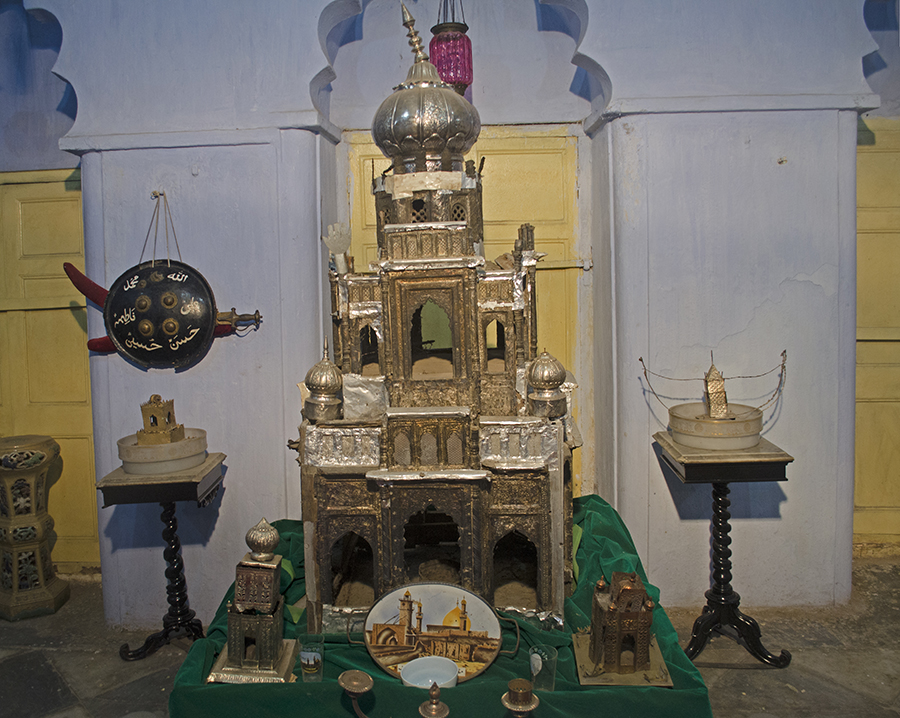
Grave of Wajid Ali Shah at Sibtainbad Imambara, Metiabruz

Heartbroken after leaving Lucknow, he tried to carve out a miniature of Lucknow in Metiabruz. In his exile in Metiabruz, complete with grand Islamic structures and cultural hubs, he arranged dance and music events and nurtured his love of poetry and the arts. He kept the sweet memories of his Lucknow alive by recreating the musical evenings of his Qaisarbagh Baradari. The king spent his life lavishly out of his income of 12 lakhs rupees per annum and a second Lucknow arose in this area. The Imambaras he created stands at the centre of Metiabruz. He established a zoo of exotic animals, Kabootarbazi (pigeon flying), Kite flying and brought along secret recipes from royal kitchens to feed the entourage. His royal chefs knew the recipes of the Awadhi Kitchen, which arrived in Kolkata with them. Awadhi cuisine was distinguished by its delicious biryani, a dish of spiced rice and meat that was popular for its aromatic richness and flavour balance. Due to a shortage of funds following the banishment, the cooks started using potatoes and eggs instead of a large quantity of meat to maintain the royalty. These skilled chefs adapted their traditional recipes to suit the local taste buds, resulting in the birth of Kolkata Biryani.

=== Surinaam Ghat ===
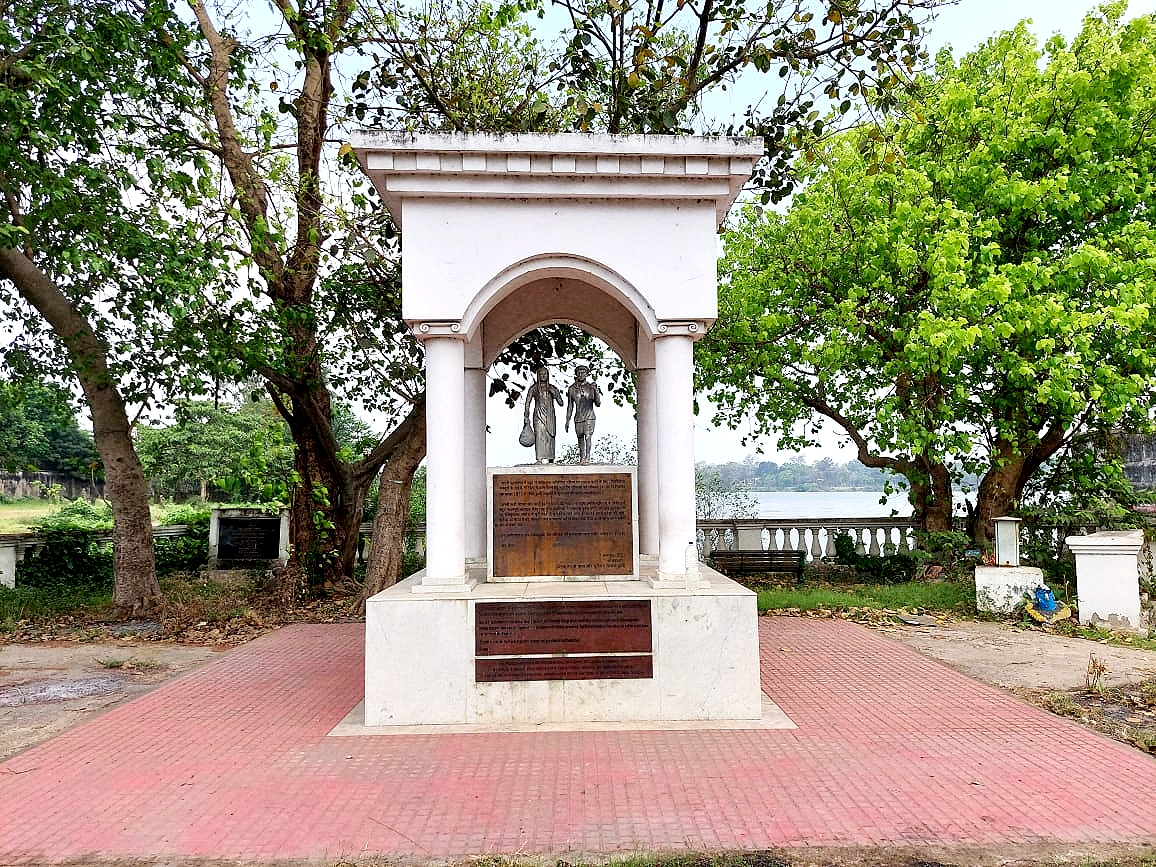
Baba & Mai statue at Suriname Ghat

Owned by the Port Trust of India this Ghat is situated at the eastern bank of Hooghly River near Kolkata Port. It is named after the South American Caribbean country Suriname commemorating the indentured migration of Indian workers from this ghat to that country. A total of 64 sailing ships carried 34,300 workers to the country from 1873 to 1917. Suriname ghat is also popularly known as Balu Ghat.

In the Honour of Indian indentured workers who had migrated to Suriname, an aluminium statue of a plainly-dressed couple carrying a potli which symbolizes the first Indian man and woman to set foot on Suriname was set up as a memorial. It was unveiled by Union External Affairs Minister Sushma Swaraj on 7 October 2015. The statue is a replica of the Baba and Mai monument in Paramaribo, Suriname's capital and is gifted by the government of Suriname.

== Geography ==
=== Location ===
Garden Reach, located in the south-western part of the city, is bounded by the Kidderpore in the east, Taratala and Behala in the south and Maheshtala in the south west.

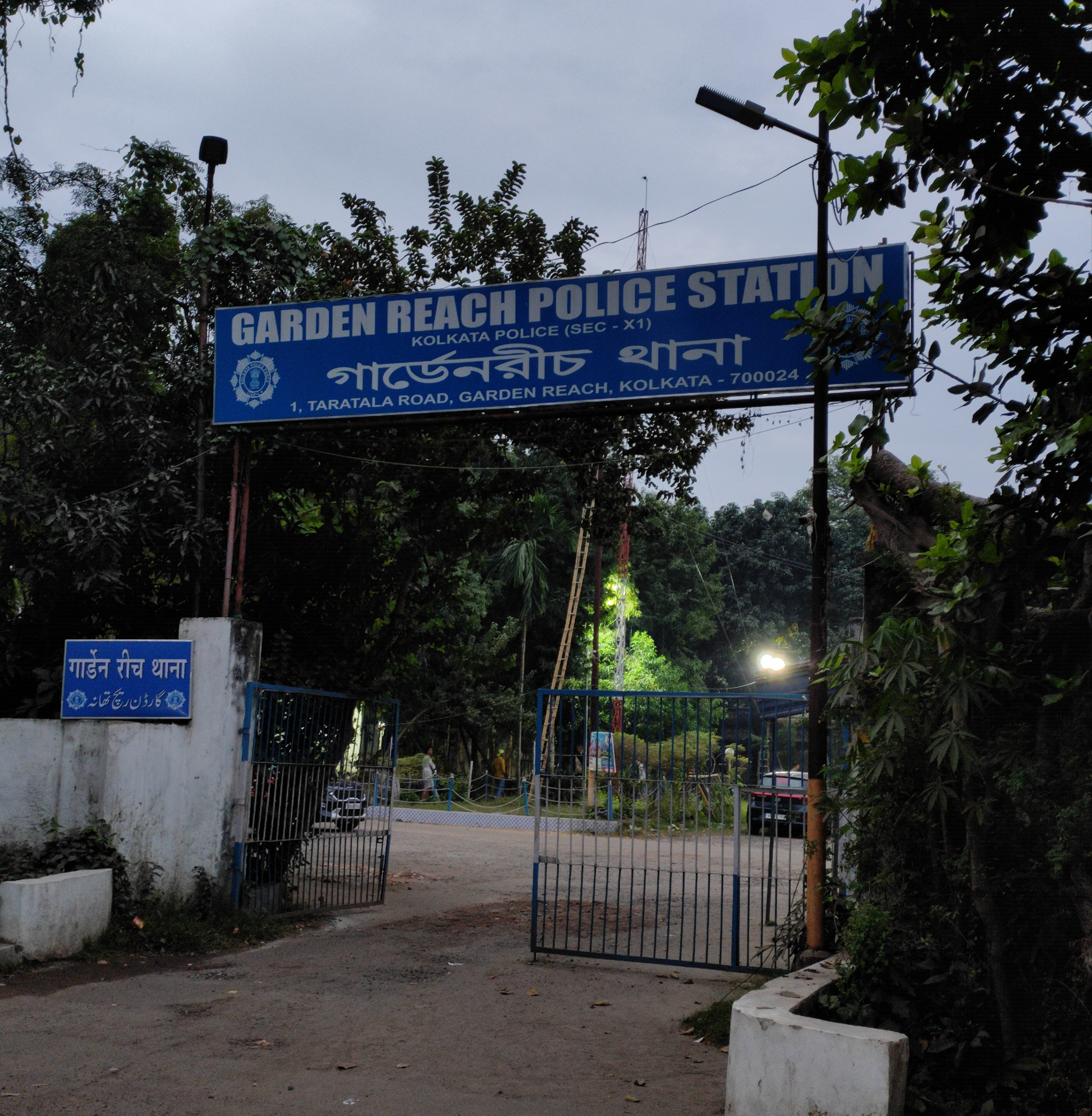
Garden Reach Police station

=== Police station ===
The area is served by the Garden Reach police, Metiabruz police, West Port police, Nadial Police, Rajabagan police and Rabindranagar police.

=== Post office ===
Garden Reach is a vast locality with many Postal Index Numbers:

Garden Reach has a delivery sub post office, with PIN 700024 in the Kolkata South Division of Kolkata district in Calcutta region. Other post offices with the same PIN are K.C Mills and T.G Road.

Bartala has a delivery sub post office, with PIN 700018 in the Kolkata South Division of Kolkata district in Calcutta region. Other post office with the same PIN is Rabindra Nagar.

South Eastern Railway has a delivery sub post office, with PIN 700043 in the Kolkata South Division of Kolkata district in Calcutta region. Other post office with the same PIN is Sonai.

Rajabagan Dock Yard has a non-delivery sub post office, with PIN 700044 in the Kolkata South Division of Kolkata district in Calcutta region. Other post office with the same PIN is Badartala.

Bidhangarh has a delivery sub post office, with PIN 700066 in the Kolkata South Division of Kolkata district in Calcutta region.

=== Crimes ===
- On 11 February 2013 a police officer, Tapas Choudhury, was shot dead as members of the students' wings of Indian National Congress and Trinamool Congress violently clashed at Harimohan Ghose College while filling the nomination papers for the students' union election. Four students were injured in the violence.
- On 18 March 1984 during a clash between residents, a mob clashed with the police and the police fired several rounds. As a result, a deputy commissioner, Vinod Mehta, and his bodyguard, Mokhtar Ali, were killed by anti-socials.

== Economy ==
=== Industry ===
Some of the major industries in the Garden Reach area are:

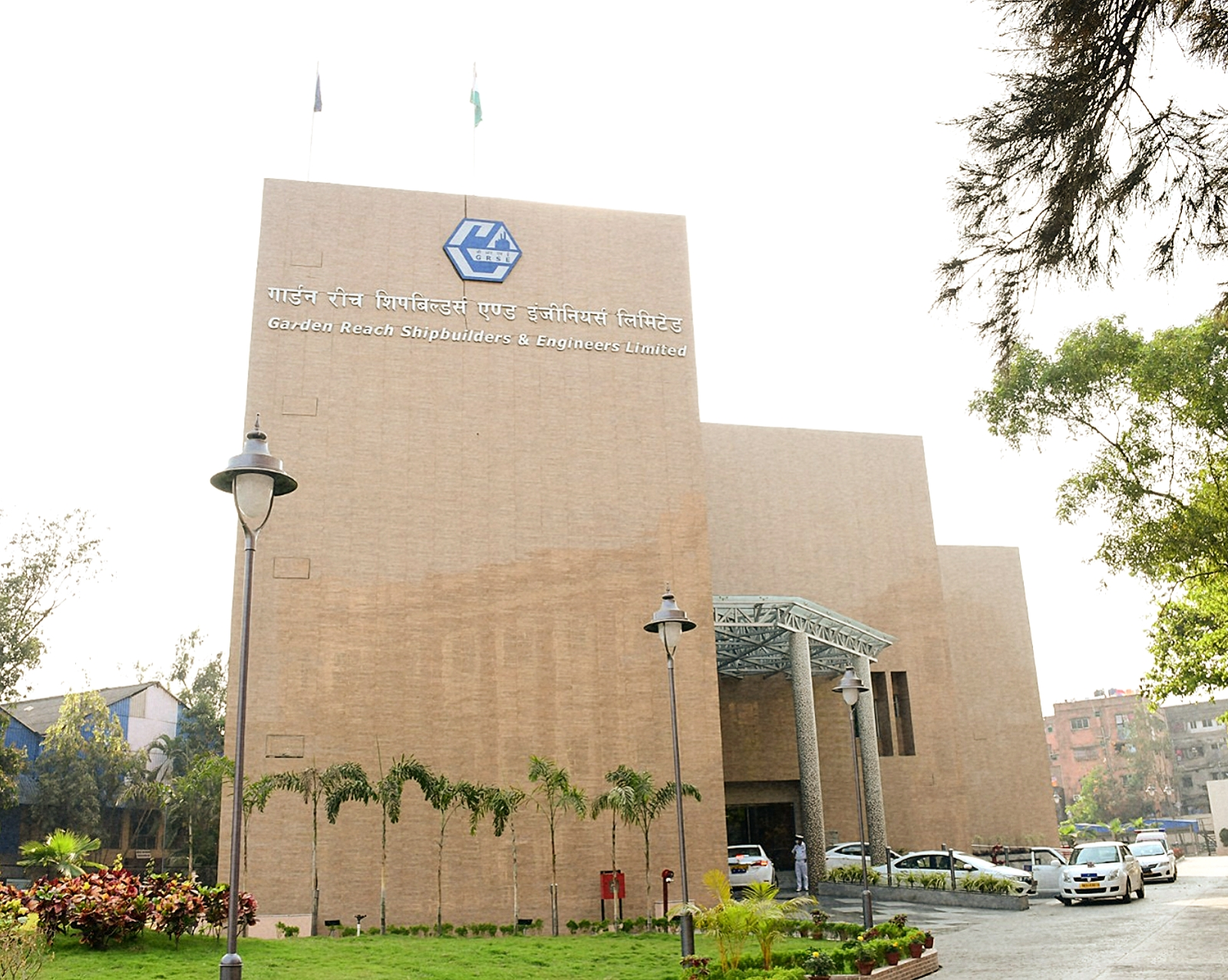
GRSE Headquarters

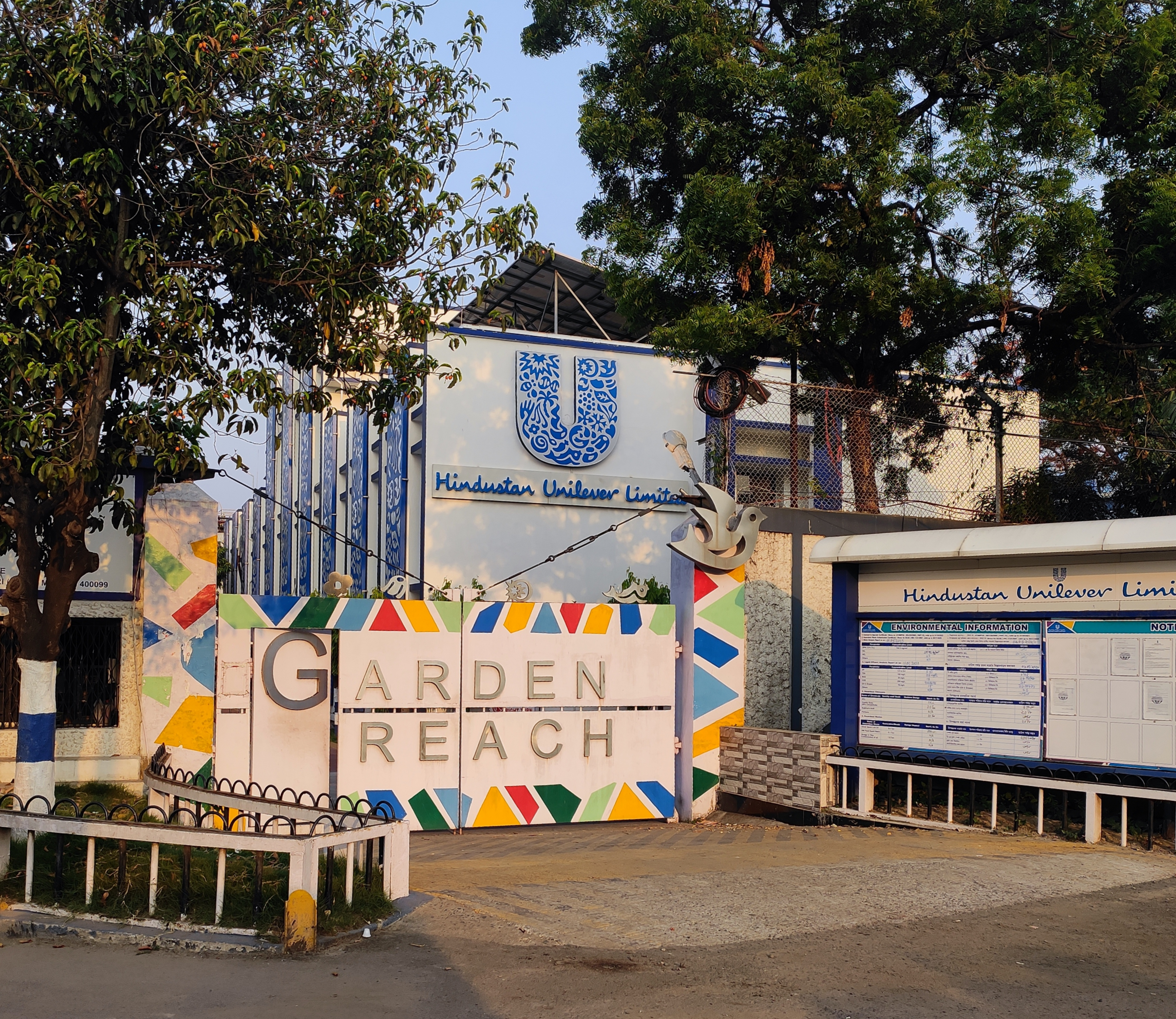
Hindustan Unilever

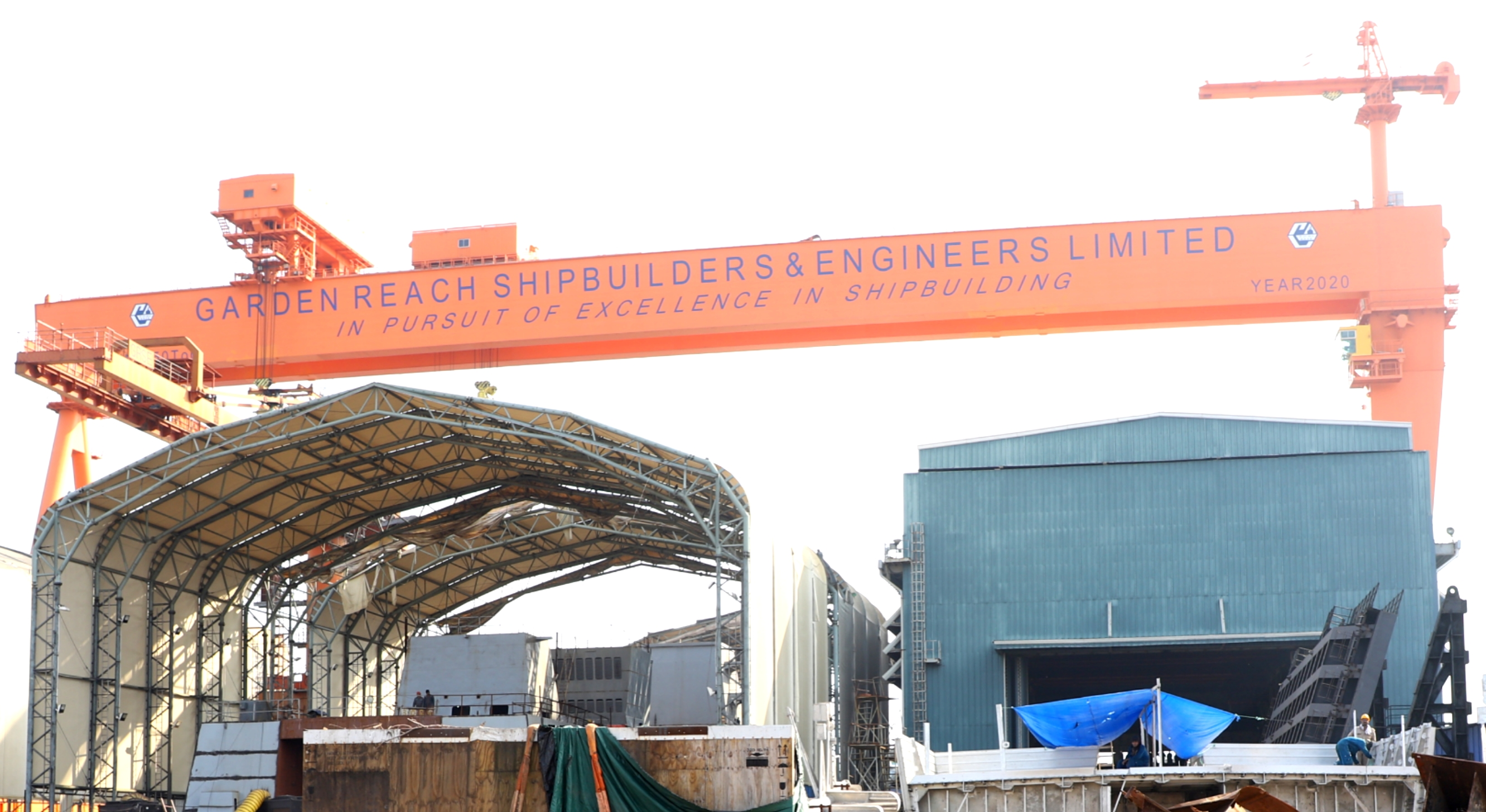
Garden Reach Ship Builders & Engineers Main Unit

- Garden Reach Shipbuilders & Engineers - the premier warship building company in India, under the administrative control of Ministry of Defence.
- ITC Ltd., Garden Reach, the Kolkata-based largest cigarette manufacturer in India, which has diversified into Fast-Moving Consumer Goods (FMCG), hotels etc.
- Hindustan Unilever, Garden Reach, consumer goods company.
- Everest Industries Limited, Garden Reach.
- TIL Limited (formerly known as Tractors India Ltd.), Garden Reach.
- Paharpur Cooling Towers Ltd., Garden Reach, pioneers and leader in cooling towers.
- General Electricals Co. Ltd., Paharpur, Kolkata.
- Marathon Electric Motors India Limited.
- Britania Biscuit Co. Ltd., Hide Road, Kolkata.
- Balmer Lawrie & Co Ltd., Hide Road, Kolkata.
- Videocon Glass and Appliances Factory.
- Danieli India Limited, Hari Mohan Ghosh Rd, Garden Reach.
- Readymade Garments manufacturing at Metiabruz.
- The Ananda Bag Tea Co. Ltd.
- Victoria Jute Mill, Garden Reach.
- Southern Generating Station CESC Limited.
- A bottling plant unit of Indian Oil Corporation.
- A bottling plant unit of Hindustan Petroleum.
- Santoshpur Industrial Estate.

== Education ==
The following institutions are located in the Garden Reach area:

Colleges:

- Harimohan Ghose College
- Matiaburj College
- Panchur College

Government schools:

- Arya Parishad Vidyalaya
- A P J Abdul Kalam English Medium School
- Bengali Bazar High School
- Bartala Girls High School
- Badartala High School
- Fatehpur Giribala Girls High School
- Fatepur Hindi Nagari Pracharak Vidyalaya
- Garden Reach Kesoram Cotton Mills High School
- Garden Reach Maulana Azad Memorial Girls High School
- Garden Reach Mudiali Girl's High School
- Garden Reach Mudiali High School
- Garden Reach Nut Behari Das Boy's High School
- Garden Reach Nut Behari Das Girl's High School
- Kendriya Vidyalaya Garden Reach
- Garden Reach Madhyamik Vidyalaya
- Maulana Hasrat Mohani Memorial Girls High School
- Maulana Mohammad Ali Jauhar Girls High School
- Judge Abdul Bari Girls High School
- Haji Ratan Multipurpose High School
- Metiabruz High School
- Metiabruz Girls' High School
- Nadial High School
- Santoshpur Shyama Prasad Vidyalaya For Girls

Private schools:

- Stella Maris Church & School
- Birla Bharati
- Al-Ameen Mission, Panchur
- The Garden Reach School
- Garden Reach Tiny Tots School
- Guru Nanak Modern School
- P.A.J's English Day School
- Little Steps School (Ashoka Hall Group)
- St. Annes Day School, Garden Reach
- Mount Litera Zee School, Garden Reach
- J D School, Metiabruz
- Dar Al-Arqam International School
- All Saints High School, Kolkata
- Nalanda English Medium School
- St. Mathew Convent School
- St. Anthony's Day School
- The Study Park

== Hospitals ==
- Garden Reach State General Hospital
- Metiabruz Super-Speciality Hospital
- S.E Railway Central Hospital
- Garden Reach Maternity Hospital
- Metiabruz Seva Sadan Hospital
- Unipon Hospital & Medical Sciences Pvt Ltd
- Susrut Eye Foundation

== Notable people ==
- Biman Banerjee – Speaker of the West Bengal Legislative Assembly
- Arnab Mondal, footballer

== Transport ==
=== Road ===
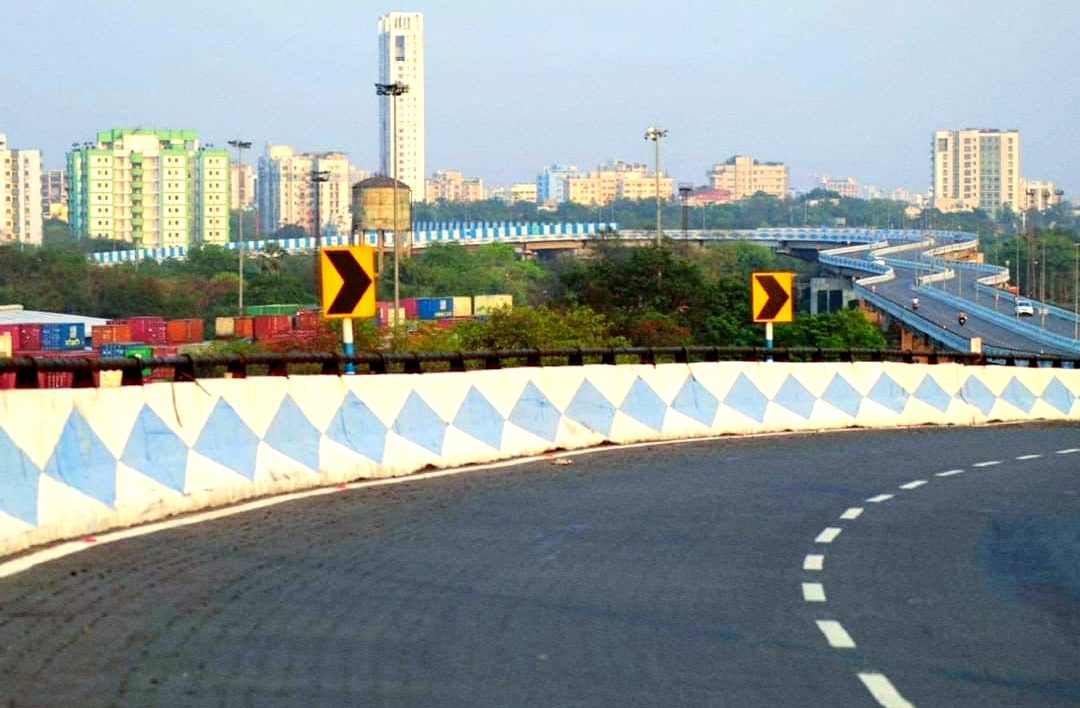
Garden Reach Flyover, Brooklyn

Transport system of Garden Reach has been improved. Although traffic jam occurs at late night after 11pm. Garden Reach Flyover, which connects Garden Reach with Majherhat, helps in smooth transportation of vehicles. The port area is congested primarily because of the trailers. However, people of Garden Reach are now using this flyover from brook lane in the Garden Reach area to reach Diamond Harbour Road easily. The foundation stone of the flyover was laid on 1 March 2014, after being approved by Central Government. Its estimated project cost is of Rs 313.27 crore. The project was completed in 2018.

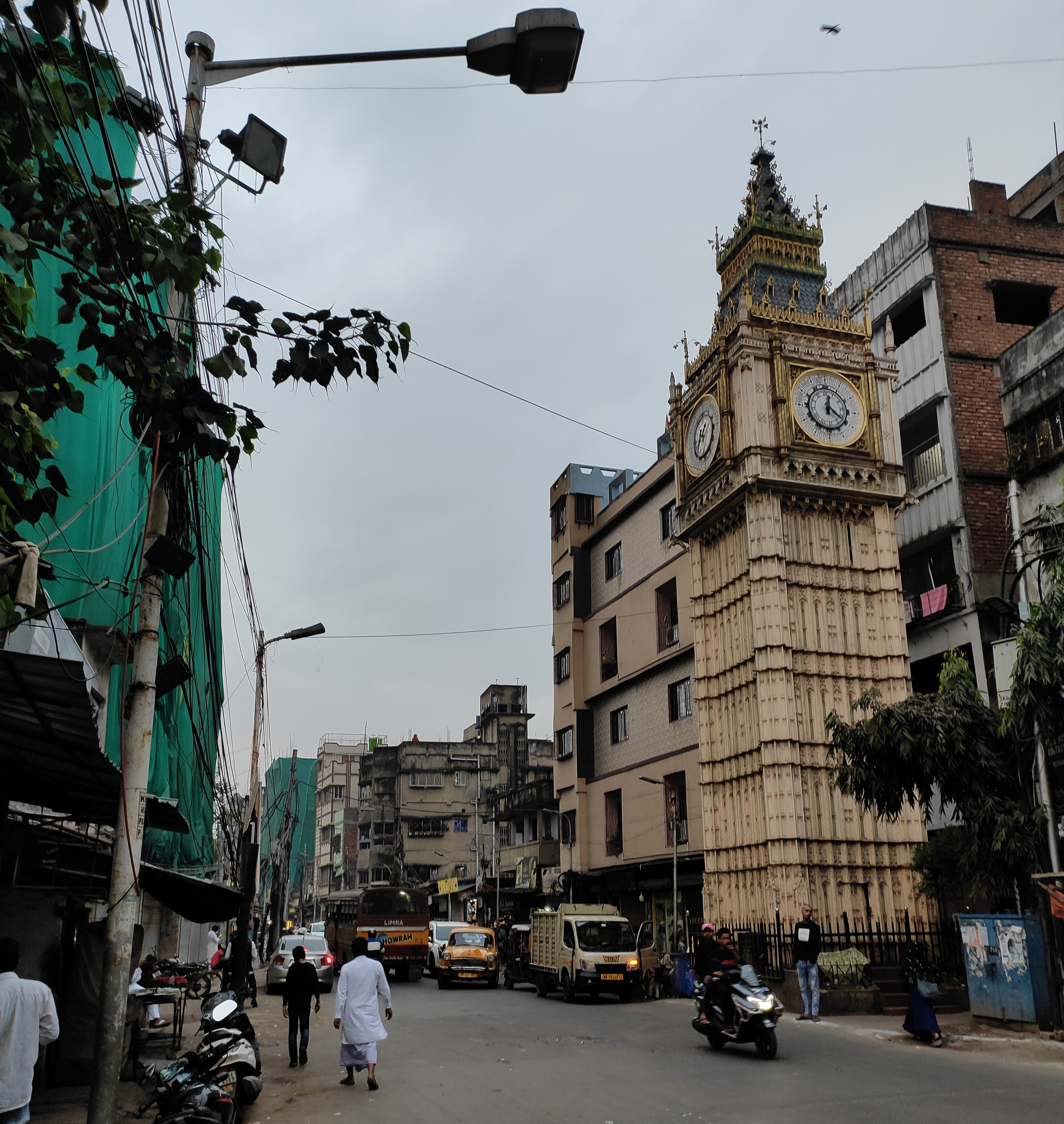
Garden Reach Road

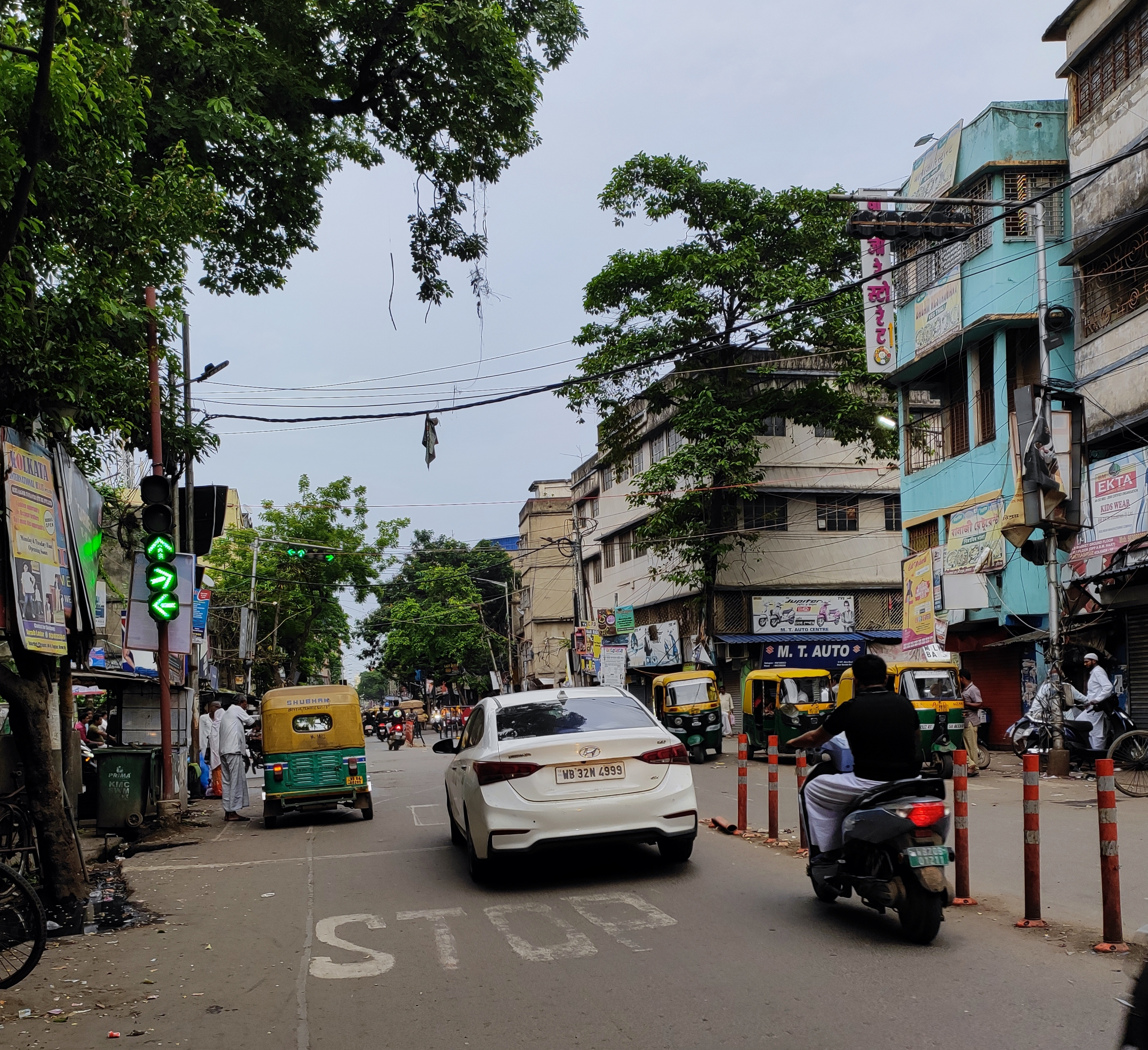
S.A Farooquie Road

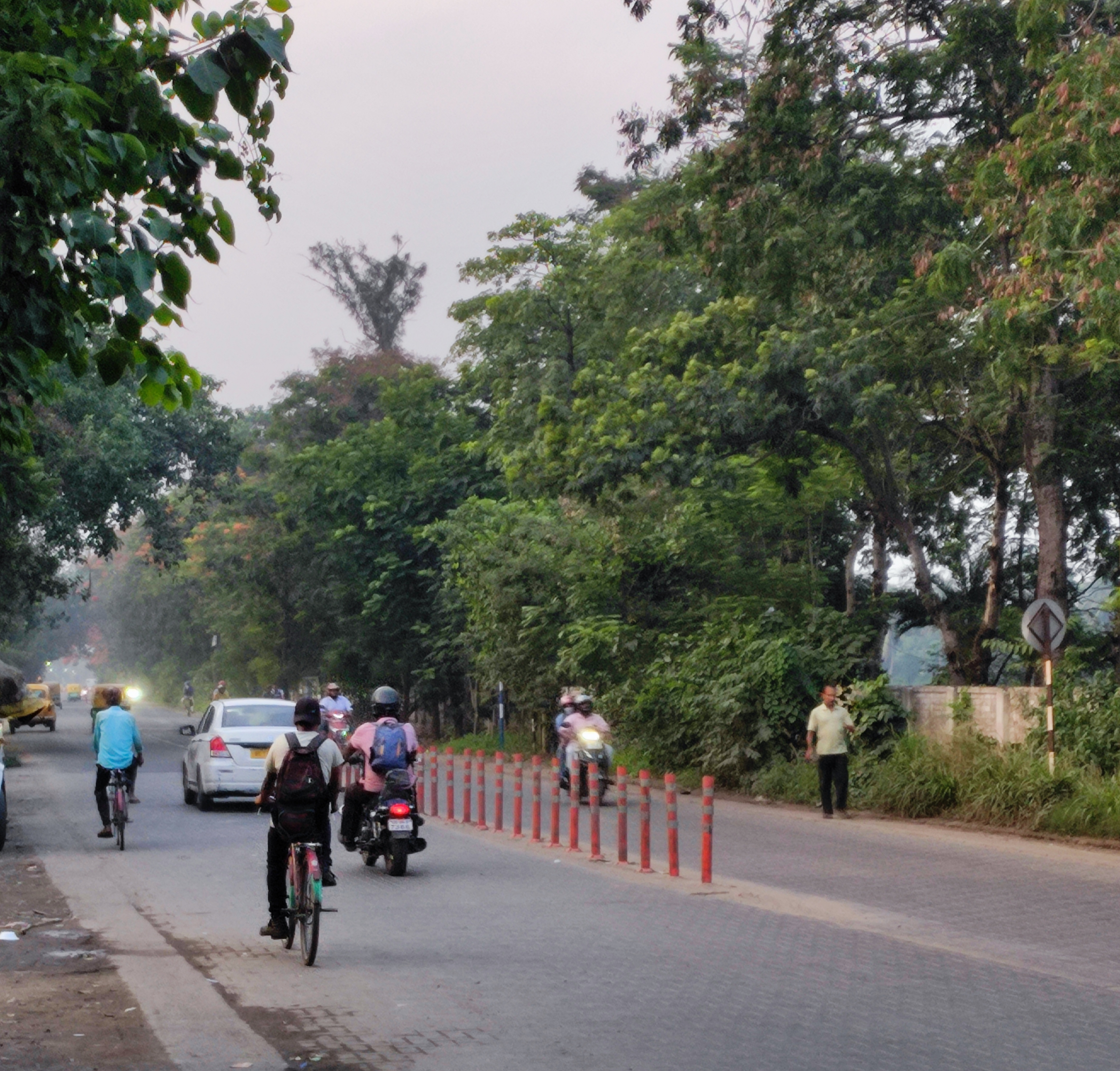
Taratala Road

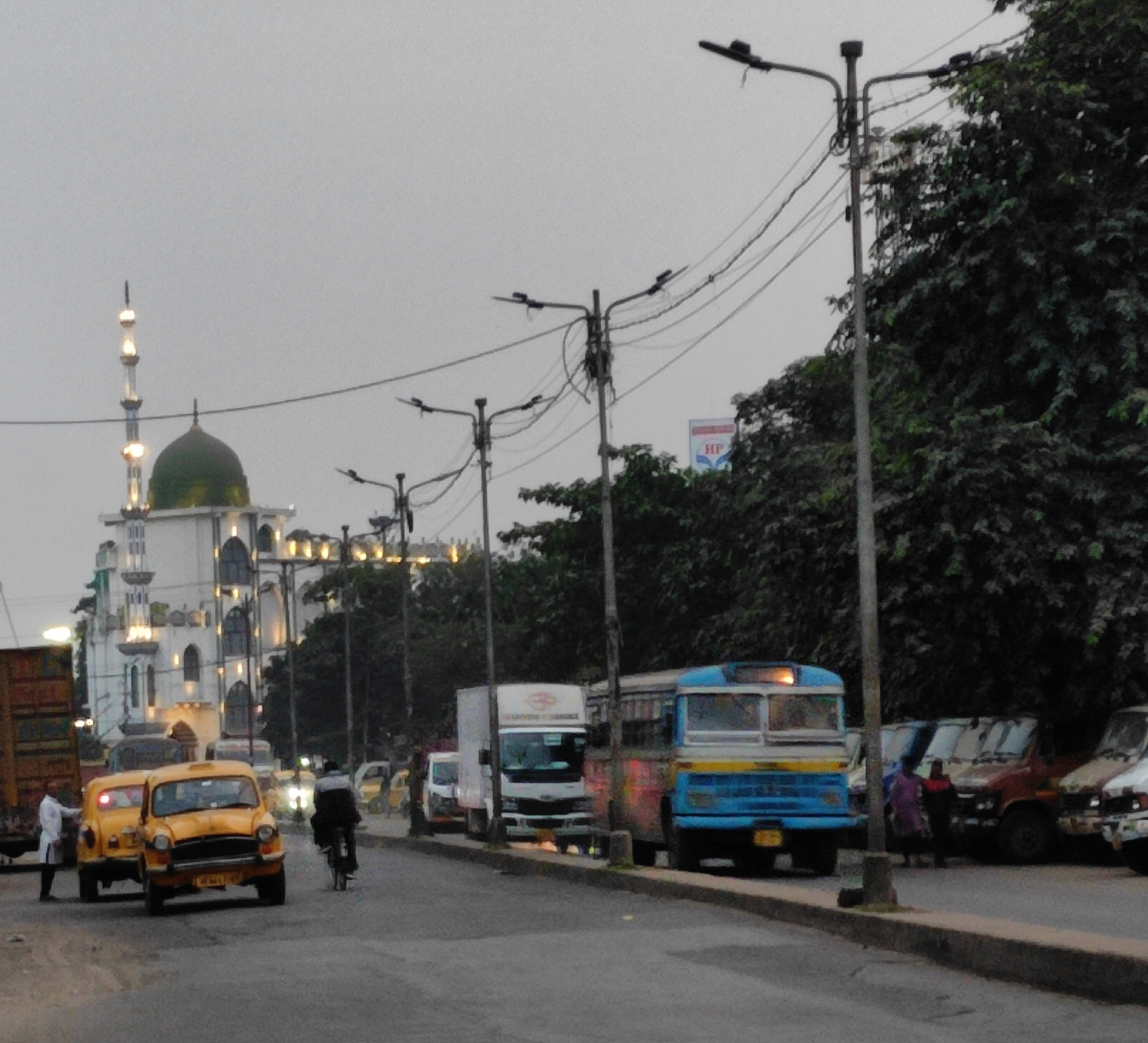
Karl Marx Sarani

Several buses ply on Garden Reach Road, Paharpur Road, Karl Marx Sarani, S.A Farooquie Road, Santoshpur Road and Taratala Road are:

=== Private Bus ===
- 227 BNR Colony - Bangur Avenue
- 1 Ramnagar - Mukundapur
- 1A Ramnagar - Mukundapur
- 1B Ramnagar - Garia Station
- 12 Rajabagan - Esplanade/Rajabazar
- 12/1 Ramnagar - Rajabazar
- 12A Rajabagan - Howrah Station
- 12B Kamal Talkies - Esplanade
- S-161 Metiabruz - Shyambazar
- S-123 Metiabruz - Howrah Station
- 42A Bichali Ghat - Picnic Garden
- 42B Bichali Ghat - Garia Station
- 12AD Akra Phatak - Howrah Station

=== WBTC Bus ===
- C-7 Harimohan Ghose College - Howrah Station
- 14-A Harimohan Ghose College - Karunamoyee
- S-62 Metiabruz (Bichali Ghat) - Kasba Bus Depot
- S-46 Rabindra Nagar - Karunamoyee (Salt Lake)

=== Ferry ===
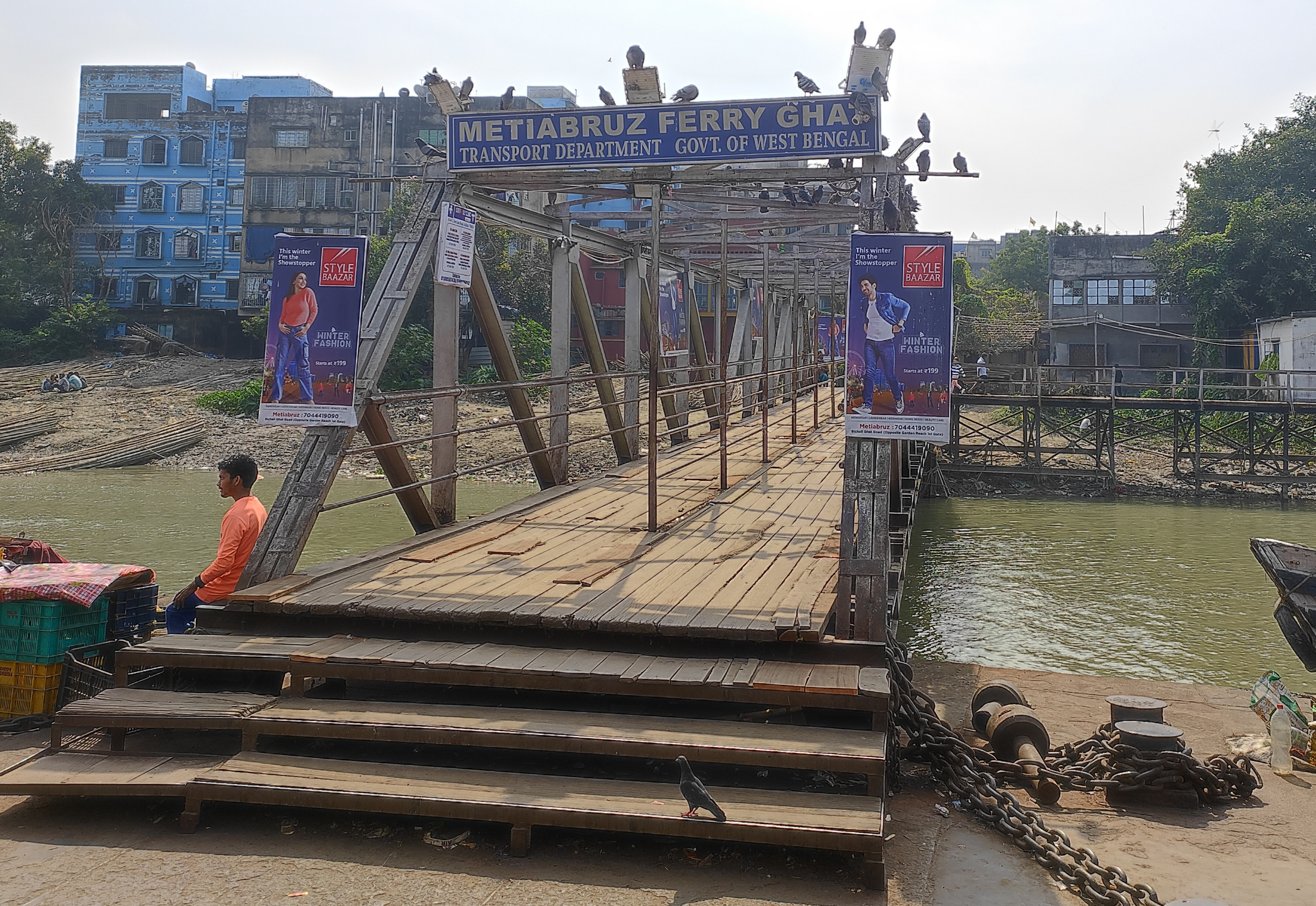
Metiabruz Ferry Ghat (Bichali Ghat)

Metiabruz Ferry Ghat provides ferry service from Garden Reach (Bichali Ghat) to Nazirgunge near Botanical Garden in Howrah.

=== Railway ===
Santoshpur railway station on the Budge Budge Branch line is situated nearby. Auto services are available from Bandhabartala, Bartala Rail line more, Haziratan Hati Park to Santoshpur railway station.

== See also ==
- Port of Kolkata
- Nature Park of India
- Kolkata Port Assembly constituency
- Metiaburuz Assembly constituency
