= Ekbalpur =

- Neighbourhood in Kolkata (Calcutta)
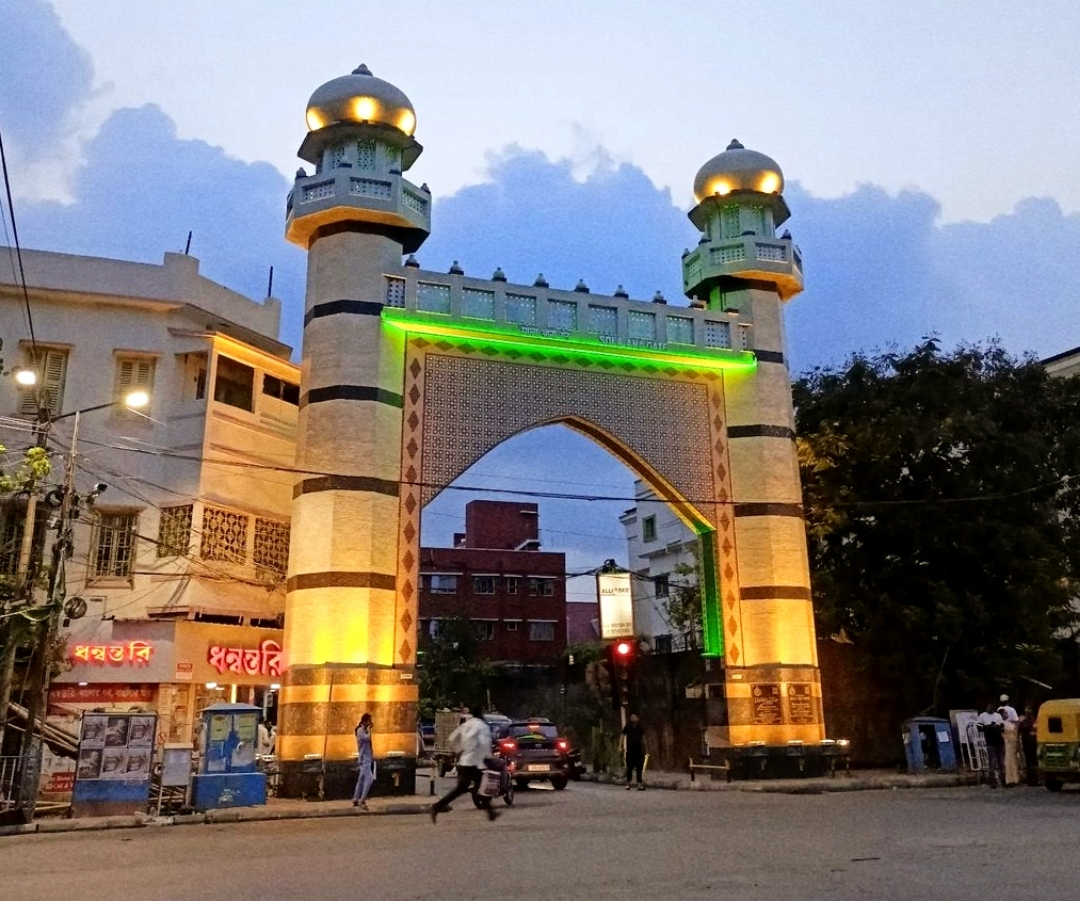

- Location in Kolkata
- Coordinates: 22.536323°N 88.322454°E
- Country: India
- State: West Bengal
- City: Kolkata
- District: Kolkata
- Municipal Corporation: Kolkata Municipal Corporation
- KMC ward: 77, 78

Population
  - Total: For population see linked KMC ward page
- Time zone: UTC+5:30 (IST)
- Area code: +91 33
- Lok Sabha constituency: Kolkata Dakshin
- Vidhan Sabha constituency: Kolkata Port

Ekbalpur is a neighbourhood of South Kolkata in Kolkata district in the Indian state of West Bengal.

== History ==
Ekbalpur developed as a Muslim area, as it received a large number of people displaced with the development of the zoo at Zirat, Alipore, and King George (now Netaji Subhas) Docks in Garden Reach. One of the oldest Muslim burial grounds, the 'Solah Anna', is located on Ekbalpur Road.

Ekbalpur was included in the Kolkata municipal area in 1888.

In 1888, one of the 25 newly organized police section houses was located in Ekbalpur.

== Geography ==
=== Police district ===
Ekbalpur police station is part of the Port division of Kolkata Police. It is located at 38B Ekbalpur Road, Kolkata-700023.

Watgunge Women police station, located at 16, Watgunge Street, Kolkata-700023, covers all police districts under the jurisdiction of the Port division i.e. North Port, South Port, Watgunge, West Port, Garden Reach, Ekbalpur, Nadial, Rajabagan and Metiabruz.

== Education ==
- Government Girls General Degree College, Ekbalpur

== See also ==
- Ekbalpur triple murder
