= Ekbalpur triple murder =

2014 murders in Kolkata, India

Ekbalpur triple murder was the gruesome murder of a widow and her two teenage daughters which took place in Ekbalpur, Kolkata, India in March 2014. According to Kolkata police, the two daughters were strangled to death after being hit by a hammer. The mother was also strangled to death. Then their bodies were buried under the shop owned by the accused which led to the mysterious disappearance of the family.

The victim's family accused the police of harassment as they had mentioned the prime accused Sikandar as their suspect. The police claimed Pushpa ran away with her lover. After two weeks police found, Pushpa Singh, 37, and her daughters Pradipti Singh, 14, and Aradhana, 12, were murdered and buried in the shop of prime accused Sikandar on 30 March. The residents protested outside court with black flags. The local police were accused of going soft on prime accused Sikandar though he was named by the victims' kin.

At first the case looked like disappearance. The accused bought cement, bricks, sand and stone chips on 2 April for cementing the floor after digging it up to bury the bodies of the widow and her two daughters. Investigators found they were murdered for flats.

The case resulted in political blamegame as the accused men had relations with local politician and one of them had the support of a political party. The opposition party and minority organization led a candle light march for the victims.
