= Beniapukur =

- Neighbourhood in Kolkata (Calcutta)
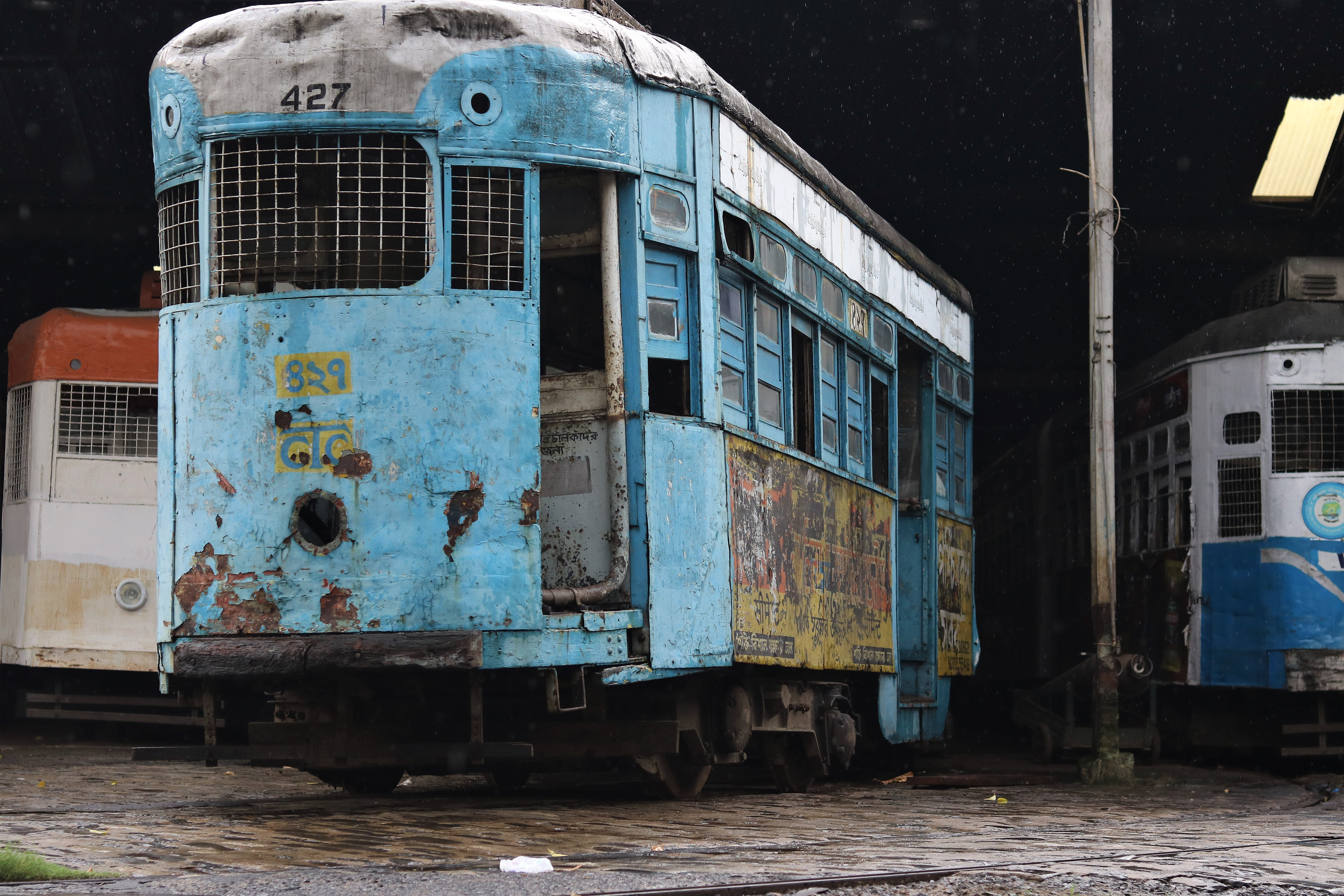
- Nonapukur Tram Depot, Beniapukur

- Location in Kolkata
- Coordinates: 22.546333°N 88.369525°E
- Country: India
- State: West Bengal
- City: Kolkata
- District: Kolkata
- Nearest Metro Station: Rabindra Sadan, Maidan, Park Street, Sealdah and Barun Sengupta(under construction)
- Municipal Corporation: Kolkata Municipal Corporation
- KMC wards: 59, 60, 61

Population
  - Total: For population see linked KMC ward page
- Time zone: UTC+5:30 (IST)
- PIN: 700014
- Area code: +91 33
- Lok Sabha constituency: Kolkata Dakshin
- Vidhan Sabha constituency: Ballygunge

Beniapukur is a neighbourhood of Central Kolkata in Kolkata district in the Indian state of West Bengal. It is adjacent to Park Circus.

== Etymology ==
The name of the neighbourhood is derived from two words, benia and pukur. Influential benias or merchants, particularly gandhabaniks, perfume and spice traders, settled here. They had dug a tank or pukur in the area.

== History ==
The East India Company obtained from the Mughal emperor Farrukhsiyar, in 1717, the right to rent from 38 villages surrounding their settlement. Of these 5 lay across the Hooghly in what is now Howrah district. The remaining 33 villages were on the Calcutta side. After the fall of Siraj-ud-daulah, the last independent Nawab of Bengal, it purchased these villages in 1758 from Mir Jafar and reorganised them. These villages were known en-bloc as Dihi Panchannagram and Beniapukur was one of them.

The Maratha Ditch was dug in 1742 and it was partly filled up in 1799 to create the Circular Road (now Acharya Jagaidsh Chandra Bose Road).

Entally, Maniktala, Beliaghata, Ultadanga, Chitpur, Cossipore, parts of Beniapukur, Ballyganj, Watganj and Ekbalpur, and parts of Garden Reach and Tollygunj were added to Kolkata Municipal Corporation in 1888. Garden Reach was later taken out.

In 1888, one of the 25 newly organized police section houses was located in Beniapukur, which is mentioned from the mid-eighteenth century, but the thana dates from the early 19th century.

== Geography ==
=== Police district ===
Beniapukur police station is part of the South East division of Kolkata Police. It is located at 48A, Gorachand Road, Kolkata-700014.

Karaya Women police station, has jurisdiction over all police districts under the jurisdiction of the South East Division, i.e. Topsia, Beniapukur, Ballygunge, Gariahat, Lake, Karaya, Rabindra Sarobar and Tiljala.

== Education ==
- Pratt Memorial School at Beniapukur is an English-medium girls only school. The school prepares its students for the Indian School Certificate (ISC) and the Indian Certificate of Secondary Education (ICSE) examinations. The school was founded in 1876 in memory of Archdeacon John Henry Pratt primarily for the education of Anglo-Indian and Christian children. It is under the Diocese of Kolkata, the Church of North India, and is an unaided minority institution.
- The Frank Anthony Public School, Kolkata at Beniapukur is an English-medium co-educational school. The foundation stone of the school was laid by social activist Frank Anthony in 1965. The school prepares its students for the Indian School Certificate (ISC) and the Indian Certificate of Secondary Education (ICSE) examinations.

== Healthcare ==
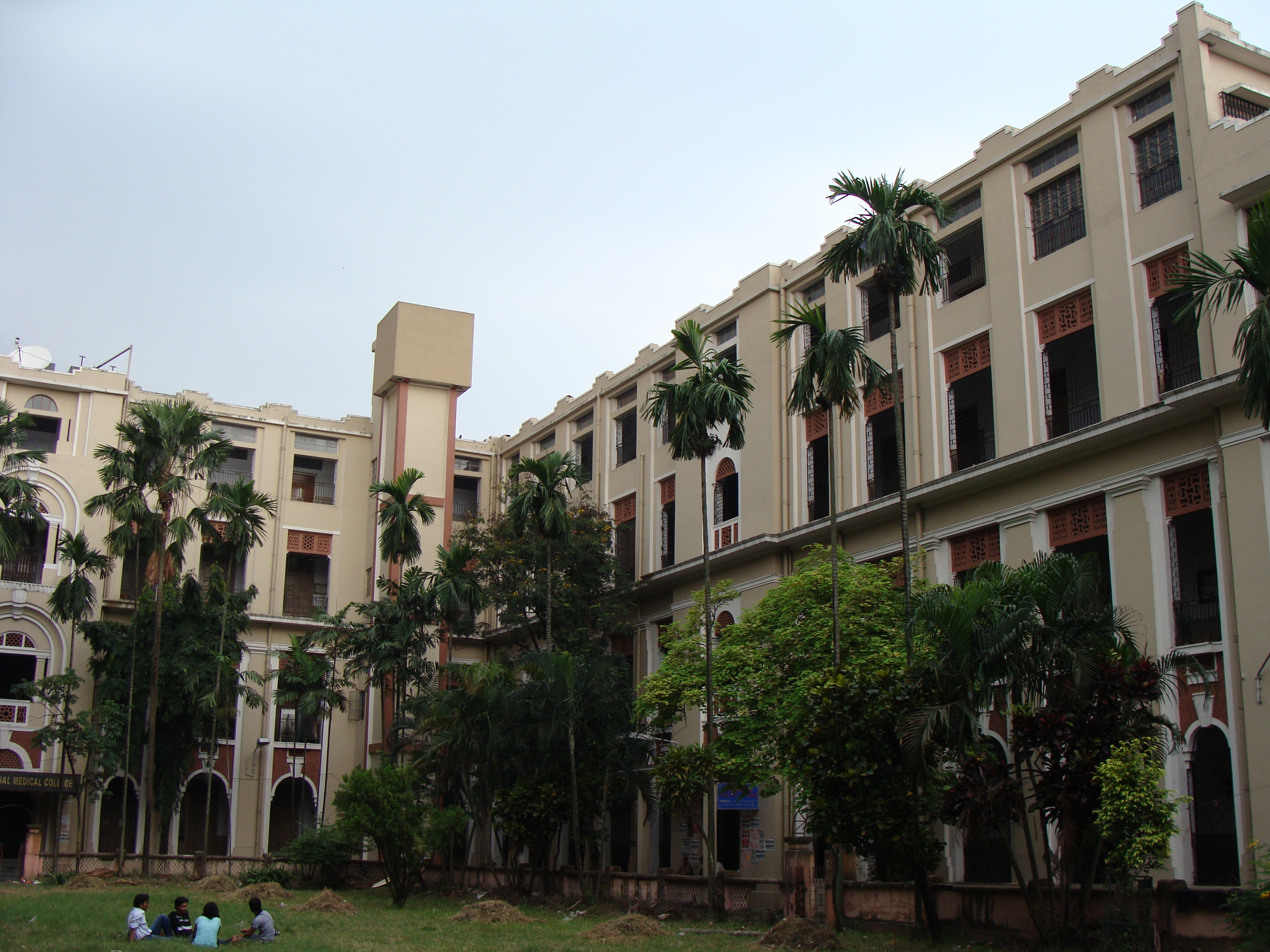
Academic Section of Calcutta National Medical College and Hospital (Chittaranjan Hospital)

- Calcutta National Medical College and Hospital (Chittaranjan Hospital) at Beniapukur offers MBBS, Post graduate (MD, MS, Diploma) and Post Doctoral (DM, Mch) courses and is affiliated to the West Bengal University of Health Sciences. The Royal College of Physicians and Surgeons was set up in 1911 at Bow Bazar. The name was later changed to National Medical College of India and still later became Calcutta Medical College on land donated by Maharaja Sir Manindra Chandra Nandy on Upper Circular Road. Another medical institute at Bow Bazar started as Calcutta Free Hospital in 1910, became Kings Hospital National Medical College (Jatiya Vaidya Shastrapith) and later changed its name to National Medical Institute (Jatiya Aurvigyan Vidyalaya). Both the medical institutions were merged in 1923, and became Calcutta Medical Institute. In 1925, Deshbandhu Chittaranjan Das, then Mayor, allotted a plot of land at Beniapukur for construction of a hospital of National Medical Institute. He also laid the foundation stone for the hospital and it was for some time named after him. In 1948, Calcutta National Medical Institute was formed with the amalgamation of National Medical Institute and Calcutta Medical Institute. The latter's property at Upper Circular Road was disposed of. Calcutta National Medical College and Hospital was totally moved to Beniapukur in 1964 and in 1967, it was taken over by the government. Calcutta National Medical College and Hospital, a state government hospital has 1,470 beds.

== Transport ==
=== Road ===
Many buses ply along Acharya Jagadish Chandra Bose Road, Park Street, Suhrawardy Avenue, Darga Road and CIT Road in Beniapukur. Nonapukur tram depot-cum-workshop, where all manufacturing, modernisation and refurbishing of trams are done, is also situated here. Kolkata tram route no. 25 serves Beniapukur (via Nonapukur-AJC Bose Road-Park Street-Park Circus).

=== Train ===
Park Circus railway station on Sealdah South Lines is the nearest railway station. Sealdah Station, one of the major railway-terminals of the city, is also located nearby.
