= Park Circus =

- Neighbourhood in Kolkata (Calcutta)
- Location in Kolkata
- Coordinates: 22.5392°N 88.3700°E
- Country: India
- State: West Bengal
- City: Kolkata
- District: Kolkata
- Municipal Corporation: Kolkata Municipal Corporation
- Kolkata Municipal Corporation wards: 60, 61, 64, 65, 66, 69
- Elevation: 36 ft (11 m)

Population
  - Total: For population see linked KMC ward pages
- Time zone: UTC+5:30 (IST)
- PIN: 700014, 700017, 700046
- Area code: +91 33
- Lok Sabha constituency: Kolkata Dakshin
- Vidhan Sabha constituency: Ballygunge and Kasba

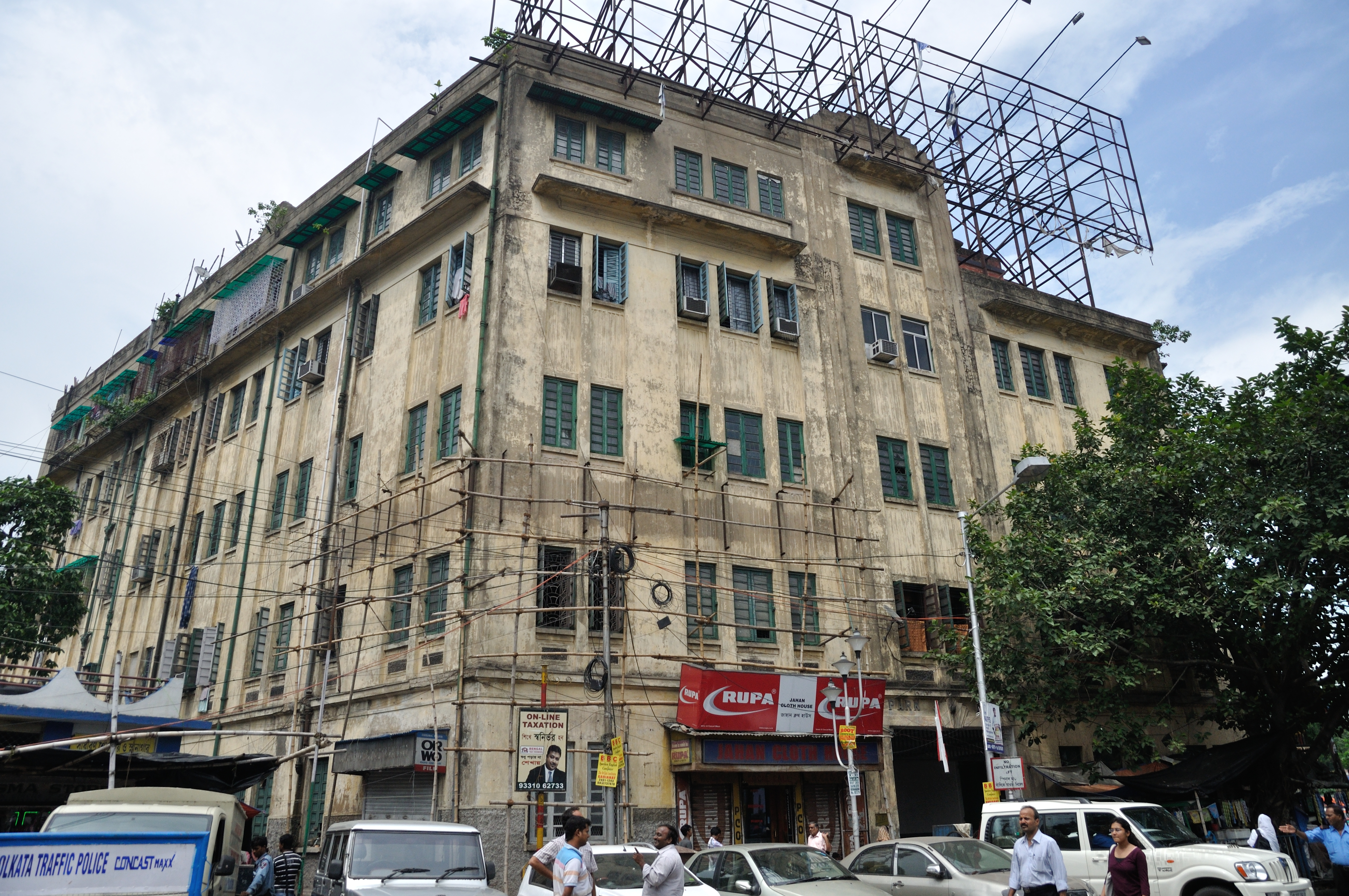
Park Palace, Park Circus

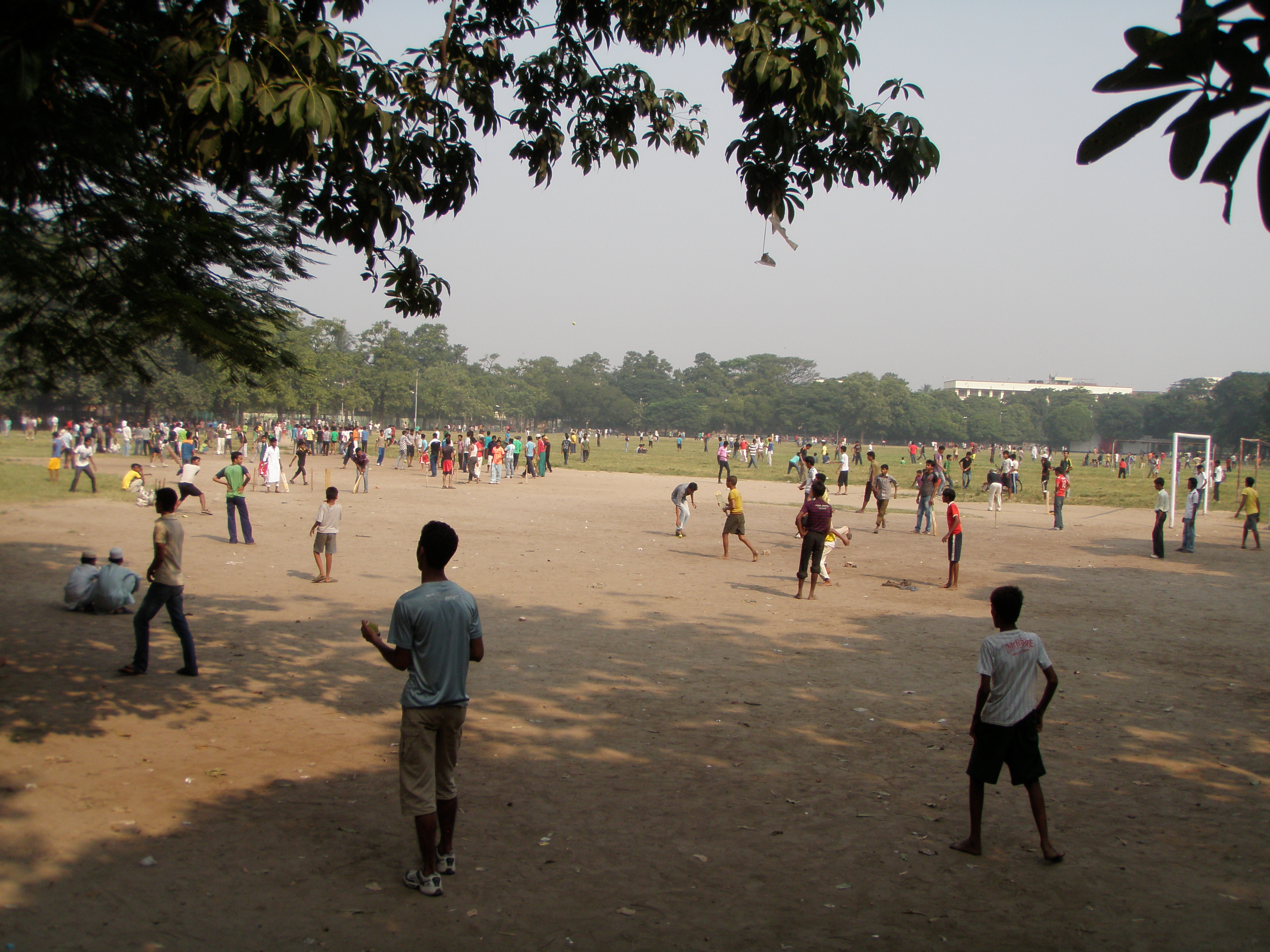
Park Circus Ground

Park Circus is a neighbourhood of South Kolkata in Kolkata district in the Indian state of West Bengal. It is one of the important junctions in South Kolkata.

== Geography ==
=== Police district ===
Karaya police station is in the South-east division of Kolkata Police.

Karaya Women Police Station, at the same address, has jurisdiction over all police districts under the jurisdiction of South East Division i.e. Topsia, Beniapukur, Ballygunge, Gariahat, Lake, Karaya, Rabindra Sarobar and Tiljala.

=== Location ===
Park Circus is flanked by Entally and Sealdah to its north, Park Street and Chowringhee to its west, Taltala to its north west, Tangra to its north east, Topsia to its east and Ballygunge to its south. It is connected to both Park Street and AJC Bose Road.

== Notable persons ==
- Leander Paes, lawn tennis player
- Abdullah Abu Sayeed, Bangladeshi writer
- Soham Majumdar, actor
