= Ward No. 98, Kolkata Municipal Corporation =

Ward No. 98
- Kolkata Municipal Corporation
- Interactive Map Outlining Ward No. 98
- Location in Kolkata
- Coordinates (dms): 22.481833°N 88.359694°E
- Country: India
- State: West Bengal
- City: Kolkata
- Neighbourhoods: Jadavpur (Bijoygarh 5 No.), Ranikuthi, Netaji Nagar, Gandhi Colony, Pallisree, Sree Colony Bazaar, Subhas Pally (Niswa Colony), Adarsha Pally, Sangati Colony, Raipur Sangati Colony-Shahid Nagar Colony, Naktala Khanpur, Suryanagar, Bansdroni (Regent Grove)
- Reservation: Open
- Parliamentary constituency: Jadavpur
- Assembly constituency: Tollyganj
- Borough: 10

Population (2011)
  - Total: 31,708
- Time zone: UTC+5:30 (IST)
- PIN: 700 092,700 040,700 047, 700 032
- Area code: +91 33

Ward No. 98, Kolkata Municipal Corporation is an administrative division of Kolkata Municipal Corporation in Borough No. 10, covering parts of added area of Tollygunge like Ranikuthi, Netaji Nagar, and Gandhi Colony-Bijoygarh-Pallisree-Sangati Colony-Shahid Nagar Colony in Jadavpur and Bansdroni (Regent Grove) neighbourhoods in South Kolkata, in the Indian state of West Bengal.

== History ==
The establishment and evolution of Kolkata Municipal Corporation followed a long process starting from around the middle of the 19th century. The Municipal Consolidation Act of 1888 and certain steps taken thereafter saw the addition of peripheral areas in the eastern and southern parts of the city to the corporation area. In 1888, there were 75 commissioners, 50 of whom were elected, 15 appointed by the government and 10 nominated from bodies like Chambers of Commerce, Trades Associations and the Port Commissioners. The Calcutta Municipal Act of 1923 brought about important changes. The adjacent municipalities of Cossipore, Chitpore, Manicktola and Garden Reach were amalgamated with Kolkata. Garden Reach was later taken out.

Post-independence developments saw the introduction of adult franchise in municipal elections in 1962. The number of wards increased from 75 to 100. Tollygunge was merged with Kolkata in 1953. The Calcutta Municipal Corporation Act 1980, which came into effect in 1984, extended the boundaries of Kolkata by including South Suburban, Garden Reach and Jadavpur municipalities in Kolkata. With the addition of Joka to Kolkata, the number of wards rose to 144.

== Geography ==
Ward No. 98 is bordered on the north by Raipur Road (East); on the east by Raipur Road, Naktala Road and Khanpur Road; on the south by Tolly's Nullah; and on the west by Netaji Subhas Chandra Bose Road and Nagendra Narayan Dutta Road.

Location of Ward No. 98 in Kolkata Ward Map

The ward is served by Netaji Nagar police station of Kolkata Police.

Patuli Women police station has jurisdiction over all police districts under the jurisdiction of South Suburban Division, i.e. Netaji Nagar, Jadavpur, Kasba, Regent Park, Bansdroni, Garfa and Patuli.

== Demographics ==
As per the 2011 Census of India, Ward No. 98, Kolkata Municipal Corporation, had a total population of 31,708, of which 15,406 (49%) were males and 16,302 (51%) were females. Population below 6 years was 1,721. The total number of literates in Ward No. 98 was 28,859 (96.24% of the population over 6 years).

Kolkata is the second most literate district in West Bengal. The literacy rate of Kolkata district has increased from 53.0% in 1951 to 86.3% in the 2011 census.

See also – List of West Bengal districts ranked by literacy rate

Literacy in KMC wards

North Kolkata
Ward No. 1 – 86.12%
Ward No. 2 – 94.24%
Ward No. 3 – 86.74%
Ward No. 4 – 89.27%
Ward No. 5 – 90.32%
Ward No. 6 – 81.12%
Ward No. 7 – 87.65%
Ward No. 8 – 93.57%
Ward No. 9 – 91.60%
Ward No. 10 – 92.38%
Ward No. 11 – 87.96%
Ward No. 12 – 84.95%
Ward No. 13 – 83.39%
Ward No. 14 – 87.87%
Ward No. 15 – 88.89%
Ward No. 16 – 88.62%
Ward No. 17 – 92.30%
Ward No. 18 – 78.72%
Ward No. 19 – 89.29%
Ward No. 20 – 85.93%
Ward No. 21 – 78.12%
Ward No. 22 – 85.07%
Ward No. 23 – 71.14%
Ward No. 24 – 73.16%
Ward No. 25 – 85.49%
Ward No. 26 – 82.34%
Ward No. 27 – 88.19%
Ward No. 28 – 79.39%
Ward No. 29 – 70.69%
Ward No. 30 – 88.71%
Ward No. 31 – 88.28%
Ward No. 32 – 75.73%
Ward No. 33 – 91.17%
Central Kolkata
Ward No. 34 – 92.79%
Ward No. 35 – 91.44%
Ward No. 36 – 66.34%
Ward No. 37 – 79.12%
Ward No. 38 – 85.77%
Ward No. 39 – 73.27%
Ward No. 40 – 88.14%
Ward No. 41 – 83.53%
Ward No. 42 – 75.02%
Ward No. 43 – 79.52%
Ward No. 44 – 79.09%
Ward No. 45 – 74.69%
Ward No. 46 – 85.38%
Ward No. 47 – 87.87%
Ward No. 48 – 82.04%
Ward No. 49 – 65.51%
Ward No. 50 – 88.70%
Ward No. 51 – 93.01%
Ward No. 52 – 86.18%
Ward No. 53 – 89.49%
Ward No. 54 – 82.10%
Ward No. 55 – 84.84%
Ward No. 56 – 85.53%
Ward No. 57 – 80.20%
Ward No. 58 – 74.35%
Ward No. 59 – 80.39%
Ward No. 60 – 74.04%
Ward No. 61 – 80.54%
Ward No. 62 – 86.04%
Ward No. 63 – 84.39%
Ward No. 64 – 85.21%
Ward No. 65 – 81.60%
South Kolkata
Ward No. 66 – 80.95%
Ward No. 67 – 89.52%
Ward No. 68 – 90.86%
Ward No. 69 – 86.07%
Ward No. 70 – 94.20%
Ward No. 71 – 92.01%
Ward No. 72 – 90.06%
Ward No. 73 – 89.28%
Ward No. 74 – 84.56%
Ward No. 75 – 80.27%
Ward No. 76 – 88.40%
Ward No. 77 – 83.84%
Ward No. 78 – 83.00%
Ward No. 79 – 81.96%
Ward No. 80 – 71.89%
Ward No. 81 – 85.14%
Ward No. 82 – 84.82%
Ward No. 83 – 85.63%
Ward No. 84 – 85.71%
Ward No. 85 – 88.19%
Ward No. 86 – 89.61%
Ward No. 87 – 90.26%
Ward No. 88 – 85.09%
Ward No. 89 – 92.40%
Ward No. 90 – 84.60%
Ward No. 91 – 90.57%
Ward No. 92 – 93.53%
Ward No. 93 – 91.30%
Ward No. 94 – 89.11%
Ward No. 95 – 95.61%
Ward No. 96 – 96.57%
Ward No. 97 – 94.60%
Ward No. 98 – 96.24%
Ward No. 99 – 95.79%
Ward No. 100 – 95.98%
Ward No. 101 – 95.36%
Ward No. 102 – 93.53%
Ward No. 103 – 94.77%
Ward No. 104 – 96.03%
Ward No. 105 – 93.86%
Ward No. 106 – 92.97%
Ward No. 107 – 90.06%
Ward No. 108 – 80.74%
Ward No. 109 – 85.49%
Ward No. 110 – 91.35%
Ward No. 111 – 93.36%
Ward No. 112 – 92.50%
Ward No. 113 – 92.18%
Ward No. 114 – 91.13%
Ward No. 115 – 95.53%
Ward No. 116 – 86.91%
Ward No. 117 – 86.53%
Ward No. 118 – 90.04%
Ward No. 119 – 94.04%
Ward No. 120 – 92.15%
Ward No. 121 – 91.86%
Ward No. 122 – 92.88%
Ward No. 123 – 93.42%
Ward No. 124 – 92.55%
Ward No. 125 – 92.50%
Ward No. 126 – 93.78%
Ward No. 127 – 91.82%
Ward No. 128 – 92.67%
Ward No. 129 – 92.56%
Ward No. 130 – 95.55%
Ward No. 131 – 93.48%
Ward No. 132 – 90.30%
Ward No. 133 – 83.48%
Ward No. 134 – 73.75%
Ward No. 135 – 75.75%
Ward No. 136 – 85.01%
Ward No. 137 – 79.16%
Ward No. 138 – 78.67%
Ward No. 139 – 77.56%
Ward No. 140 – 79.93%
Ward No. 141 – 75.15%
Note: The regional distribution
is a broad one and
there is some overlapping
2011 Census: Ward-Wise

Primary Census Abstract Data

Census data about mother tongue and religion is not available at the ward level. For district level information see Kolkata district.

According to the District Census Handbook Kolkata 2011, 141 wards of Kolkata Municipal Corporation formed Kolkata district. (3 wards were added later).

== Election highlights ==
The ward forms a city municipal corporation council electoral constituency and is a part of Tollyganj (Vidhan Sabha constituency).

Election year	Constituency	Name of councillor	Party affililiation
1985	Ward No. 98	Archana Bhattacharjee	Communist Party of India (Marxist)
1990		Archana Bhattacharjee	Communist Party of India (Marxist)
1995		Archana Bhattacharjee	Communist Party of India (Marxist)
2000		Archana Bhattacharjee	Communist Party of India (Marxist)
2005		Archana Bhattacharjee	Communist Party of India (Marxist)
2010		Mrityunjoy Chakraborty	Communist Party of India (Marxist)
2015		Mrityunjoy Chakraborty	Communist Party of India (Marxist)
2021		Arup Chakraborty	All India Trinamool Congress
