= Beleghata Assembly constituency =

Legislative Assembly constituency in West Bengal, India

Beleghata
- Constituency No. 164 for the West Bengal Legislative Assembly
- Interactive Map Outlining Beleghata Assembly Constituency

Constituency details
- Country: India
- Region: East India
- State: West Bengal
- District: Kolkata
- Lok Sabha constituency: Kolkata Uttar
- Established: 1977
- Total electors: 250,880
- Reservation: None

Member of Legislative Assembly
- 18th West Bengal Legislative Assembly
- Incumbent Kunal Ghosh
- Party: MAITC
- Elected year: 2026

Beleghata Assembly constituency is a Legislative Assembly constituency of Kolkata district in the Indian state of West Bengal.

== Overview ==
As per order of the Delimitation Commission in respect of the Delimitation of constituencies in West Bengal, Beleghata Assembly constituency is composed of the following:

- Ward Nos. 28, 29, 30, 33, 34, 35, 36 and 57 of Kolkata Municipal Corporation.

Borough	Ward No.	Councillor	2021 Winner
IV	28	Ayan Chakraborty	Trinamool Congress
III	29	Iqbal Ahmed	Trinamool Congress
III	30	Papiya Ghosh	Trinamool Congress
III	33	Chinu Biswas	Trinamool Congress
III	34	Alokananda Das	Trinamool Congress
III	35	Ashutosh Das	Trinamool Congress
V	36	Sachin Kumar Singh	Trinamool Congress
VII	57	Jiban Saha	Trinamool Congress

Beleghata Assembly constituency is part of No. 24 Kolkata Uttar Lok Sabha constituency.

== Members of the Legislative Assembly ==
Election	Member	Party affiliation
1977	Krishnapada Ghosh	Communist Party of India (Marxist)
1982	Krishnapada Ghosh	Communist Party of India (Marxist)
1987	Manabendra Mukherjee	Communist Party of India (Marxist)
1991	Manabendra Mukherjee	Communist Party of India (Marxist)
1996	Manabendra Mukherjee	Communist Party of India (Marxist)
2001	Manabendra Mukherjee	Communist Party of India (Marxist)
2006	Manabendra Mukherjee	Communist Party of India (Marxist)
2011	Paresh Paul	Trinamool Congress
2016	Paresh Paul	Trinamool Congress
2021	Paresh Paul	Trinamool Congress
2026	Kunal Ghosh	Mamata All India Trinamool Congress

== Election results ==
=== 2026 ===
2026 West Bengal Legislative Assembly election: Beleghata
Party	Candidate	Votes	%	±%
AITC	Kunal Kumar Ghosh	93,757	53.85	▼11.25
BJP	Partha Chaudhury	65,181	37.44	▲14.7
CPI(M)	Paramita Roy	10,525	6.05	▼2.81
INC	Shahina Javed	1,638	0.94	
NOTA	None of the above	1,568	0.9	▼0.09
Majority		28,576	16.41	▼25.95
Turnout		174,108	91.28	▲28.1
AITC hold		Swing		

=== 2021 ===
2021 West Bengal Legislative Assembly election: Beleghata
Party	Candidate	Votes	%	±%
AITC	Paresh Paul	103,182	65.1	
BJP	Kashinath Biswas	36,042	22.74	
CPI(M)	Rajib Biswas	14,045	8.86	
NOTA	None of the above	1,564	0.99	
Majority		67,140	42.36	
Turnout		158,506	63.18	
AITC hold		Swing		

=== 2016 ===
2016 West Bengal Legislative Assembly election: Beleghata
Party	Candidate	Votes	%	±%
AITC	Paresh Paul	84,843	52.82	−4.63
CPI(M)	Rajib Biswas	58,664	36.53	−1.39
BJP	Partha Chaudhury	11,516	7.17	+5.51
None of the Above	None of the Above	3,153	1.96	New
IND	Arun Kumar Das	990	0.62	
Majority		26,179	16.29	−3.24
Turnout		1,60,613	66.38	−4.16
AITC hold		Swing	-4.63	

=== 2011 ===
2011 West Bengal Legislative Assembly election: Beleghata
Party	Candidate	Votes	%	±%
AITC	Paresh Paul	93,185	57.45	
CPI(M)	Anadi Kumar Sahu	61,497	37.92	
BJP	Arun Shaw	2,690	1.66	
IND	Surendar Tewari	1,727	1.06	
Majority		31,688	19.53	
Turnout		1,62,195	70.54	
AITC win				
