= Krishnapada Ghosh =

Indian politician (1914–1987)

Krishnapada Ghosh (1914–1987) was an Indian politician and trade unionist. He served as West Bengal Minister of Labour 1969–1970 and 1977–1985. He was a Central Committee member of the Communist Party of India (Marxist). He was also a member of the Working Committee of the Centre of Indian Trade Unions.

== Youth ==
Born in 1914, Ghosh grew up in Khulna. In 1930, he moved to Calcutta, where he joined the student movement. Around 1935/1936 he became a member of the Bengal Labour Party and active in workers activism. After about a year, he became a card-carrying member of the Communist Party of India (along with other Labour Party members). When the Labour Party broke with CPI, he renounced his CPI party membership.

== Return to the Communist Party ==
In 1945, he again joined CPI. He became a key labour organizer amongst the Kidderpore dock workers and at Saxby and Farmers. Ghosh was jailed in 1948, and remained in prison until 1952. After being freed from jail, Ghosh took up a job at the CPI daily Swadhinata.

Ghosh sided with CPI(M) in the party split. Ghosh won the Beliaghata North constituency seat in the 1967 West Bengal Legislative Assembly election. He obtained 21,387 votes (42.63%). He retained the Beliaghata North seat in the 1969 West Bengal Legislative Assembly election, obtaining 31,294 votes (66.10%).

== United Front ministry ==
Ghosh was named Minister for Labour in the second United Front government of West Bengal, formed in 1969. As Labour Minister, Ghosh sought to support labour in its confrontation with corporate interests. With the CPI(M) in charge of both the Home and Labour departments, the police were instructed not to intervene against striking workers. Gheraos were effectively legalized. Salaries of workers increased as a result. In the first six months of the second United Front government there were 551 strikes and 73 lock-outs across the state, affecting some 570,000 workers.

== 1971 & 1972 assembly elections ==
Ghosh retained the Beliaghata North seat in the 1971 West Bengal Legislative Assembly election. He obtained 23,318 votes (53.40%), defeating the All India Forward Bloc candidate in a straight contest. In the 1972 West Bengal Legislative Assembly election he was defeated by Ananta Kumar Bharati of the Indian National Congress. Ghosh finished in second place with 14,839 votes (21.60%).

== Left Front ministry ==
Ghosh won the Beliaghata constituency seat in the 1977 West Bengal Legislative Assembly election. He obtained 29,201 votes (55.82%), defeating the Janata Party and INC candidates.

Ghosh was again named Labour Minister in the Left Front government formed in 1977. His role in the Left Front government differed from that of the United Front experience, rather than unilaterally supporting labour he now sought to act as mediator between unions and employers.

He retained the Beliaghata seat in the 1982 West Bengal Legislative Assembly election, obtaining 44,277 votes (62.88%).

Ghosh retired from his post as Labour Minister in 1985, due to old age. He died in 1987.
