= Paresh Paul =

Indian politician

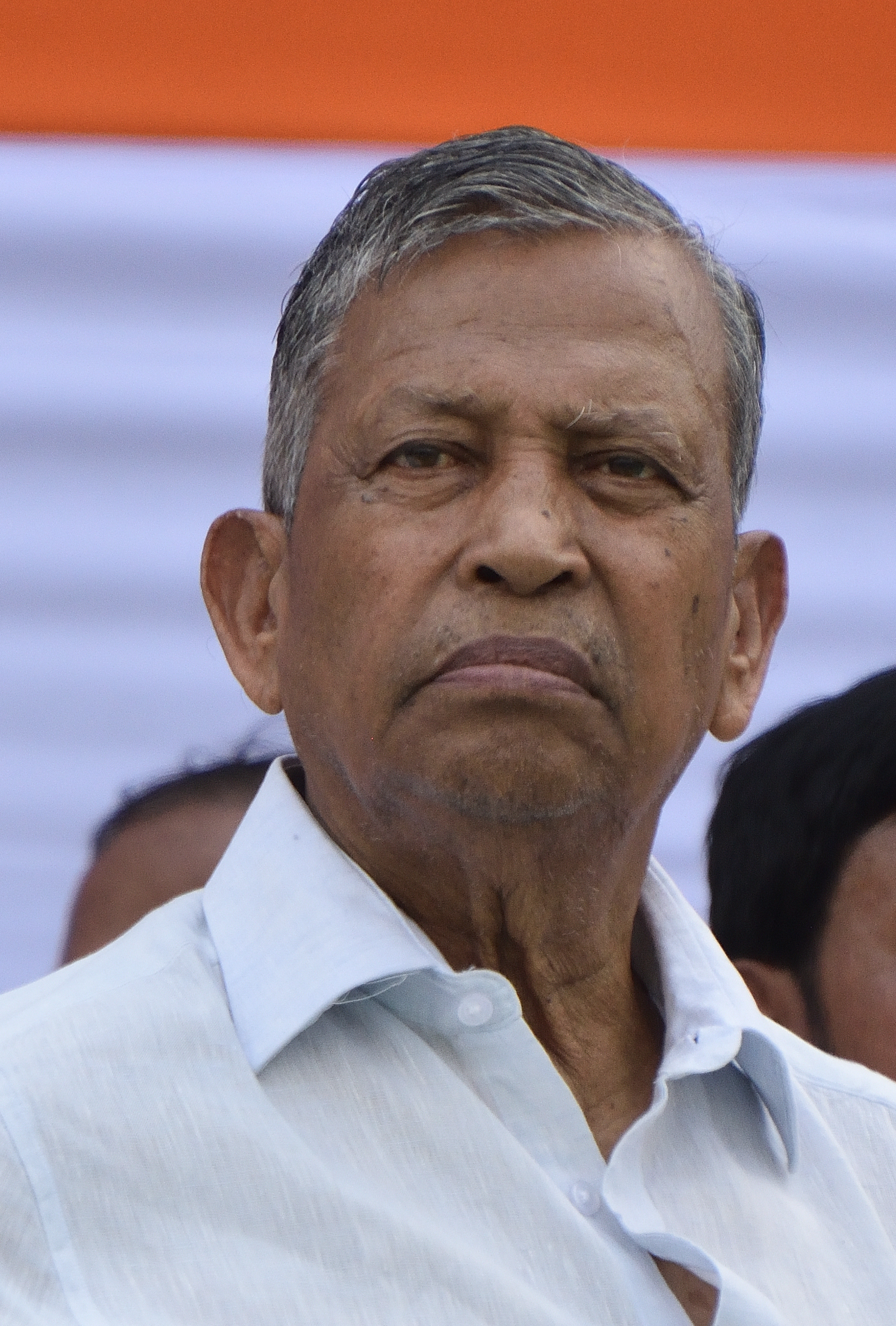
- Paresh Paul, March 2023

Member of the West Bengal Legislative Assembly
- In office 2011 – 4 May 2026
- Preceded by: Manabendra Mukherjee
- Succeeded by: Kunal Ghosh
- Constituency: Beleghata
- In office 1996–2006
- Constituency: Maniktala

Personal details
- Party: Trinamool Congress
- Profession: Politician

Paresh Paul is an Indian politician member of Trinamool Congress. He is an MLA, elected from the Beleghata constituency in the 2011 West Bengal state assembly election. In 2016 and 2021 assembly election he was re-elected from the same constituency.
