= Kunal Ghosh =

Indian journalist and politician (born 1968)

Member of West Bengal Legislative Assembly
- Incumbent
- Assumed office 4 May 2026
- Preceded by: Paresh Paul
- Constituency: Beleghata

Member of Parliament, Rajya Sabha
- In office 3 April 2012 – 2 April 2018
- Preceded by: R. C. Singh
- Succeeded by: Subhashish Chakraborty
- Constituency: West Bengal

State Secretary, All India Trinamool Congress
- Incumbent
- Assumed office 2021

Spokesperson of All India Trinamool Congress
- Incumbent
- Assumed office 2020

Personal details
- Born: 20 June 1968 (age 58) Kolkata, West Bengal, India
- Party: All India Trinamool Congress
- Education: 10th (1985)
- Occupation: Spokesperson of AITC, politician

Kunal Ghosh (born 20 June 1968) is an Indian politician and journalist. He is a member of the All India Trinamool Congress and an MLA from Beleghata. He is also a former MP, representing West Bengal in the Rajya Sabha.

== Journalism ==
Kunal Kumar Ghosh was born in Kolkata. His father, Kalyan Kumar Ghosh, was a doctor. Kunal Ghosh worked for Channel 10, as well as several newspapers. Ghosh holds the position of "message editor" of Prabaha, the first private news magazine in Bengal. His first byline story was in Patrika of the Anandabazar newspaper group. He then worked on multiple papers, including Aajkaal's Khela Patrika. His work at channel 10 included the show "Ek Phone e Ek Lakh". He also holds the position of senior editor of Sangbad Pratidin newspaper.

On 14 April 2013, an FIR was filed against Sudipto Sen and Kunal Ghosh for the allegation of involvement in Saradha Group financial scandal. Ghosh was the chief of Saradha Media. He was first arrested on 23 November 2013. Central Bureau of Investigation investigated the case. In 2014, he was found guilty of attempting suicide inside jail. On this occasion he had even said that Mamata Banerjee was the “biggest beneficiary” of the Saradha scam. Ghosh was released from jail in October 2016 on bail after almost three years. He has reportedly returned ₹ 2.67 crores that he earned from Saradha Group as salary and for advertisements paid to him by Saradha Group while he worked for the media company.

== Political career ==
=== Other positions held in Parliament ===
- July 2020: Appointed State spokesperson of Trinamool Congress.
- June 2021: Appointed as the State General Secretary of Trinamool Congress.
- May 2026: Ghosh defeated Bharatiya Janata Party candidate Partha Chaudhury in 2026 West Bengal Legislative Assembly election

== Acting career ==
Kunal made his foray into the entertainment industry by acting in two Bangla films named Korpur and Shikor. In March 2026, he announced his entry into the film "Faad", in which he will portray the character of a police officer.

== Post 2026 election incidences ==
In a protest, on 15 June 2026, outside the residence of Trinamool Congress (TMC) chief Mamata Banerjee, a rotten egg was hurled at Ghosh after he came out of a meeting inside Banerjee's house. One Chandan later took responsibility for the given incident, claiming it as being a part of public resentment against Trinamool Congress.

In a separate incident, the CID of West Bengal summoned and interrogated Ghosh for the whole day in the MLAs' forged-signature case, in which Mamata Banerjee's nephew Abhishek Banerjee is the prime accused.

== Honors ==
In 2019, Ghosh inaugurated the "Mamata Setu" (Bridge) in Cooch Behar with the help of his MP-LAD fund.

== Books ==
- Bandir Dairy
- Bagh Bidhoba
- Bacchai Bish
- Sangbadiker Dairy Theke
- Pujarini
- Fire Aschi Birotir Por
- Ranisaheba
- Thik Golpo Noy
