= Administrative divisions of Kolkata =

The Kolkata Municipal Corporation is divided into 209 administrative wards that are grouped into 16 boroughs.

Each of these wards elects a councillor to the KMC. Each borough has a committee consisting of the councillors elected from the respective wards of the boroughs. The corporation, through the borough committees, maintains government-aided schools, hospitals and municipal markets and partakes in urban planning and road maintenance. The corporation as the apex body discharges its function through the Mayor-in-Council, consisting of a mayor, assisted by a deputy mayor, and ten other elected members of the KMC. The Councillors are responsible for the overall functioning of their respective wards and has a tenure of five years.

== List of Wards ==

- Ward No. 1, Kolkata Municipal Corporation
- Ward No. 2, Kolkata Municipal Corporation
- Ward No. 3, Kolkata Municipal Corporation
- Ward No. 4, Kolkata Municipal Corporation
- Ward No. 5, Kolkata Municipal Corporation
- Ward No. 6, Kolkata Municipal Corporation
- Ward No. 7, Kolkata Municipal Corporation
- Ward No. 8, Kolkata Municipal Corporation
- Ward No. 9, Kolkata Municipal Corporation
- Ward No. 10, Kolkata Municipal Corporation
- Ward No. 11, Kolkata Municipal Corporation
- Ward No. 12, Kolkata Municipal Corporation
- Ward No. 13, Kolkata Municipal Corporation
- Ward No. 14, Kolkata Municipal Corporation
- Ward No. 15, Kolkata Municipal Corporation
- Ward No. 16, Kolkata Municipal Corporation
- Ward No. 17, Kolkata Municipal Corporation
- Ward No. 18, Kolkata Municipal Corporation
- Ward No. 19, Kolkata Municipal Corporation
- Ward No. 20, Kolkata Municipal Corporation
- Ward No. 21, Kolkata Municipal Corporation
- Ward No. 22, Kolkata Municipal Corporation
- Ward No. 23, Kolkata Municipal Corporation
- Ward No. 24, Kolkata Municipal Corporation
- Ward No. 25, Kolkata Municipal Corporation
- Ward No. 26, Kolkata Municipal Corporation
- Ward No. 27, Kolkata Municipal Corporation
- Ward No. 28, Kolkata Municipal Corporation
- Ward No. 29, Kolkata Municipal Corporation
- Ward No. 30, Kolkata Municipal Corporation
- Ward No. 31, Kolkata Municipal Corporation
- Ward No. 32, Kolkata Municipal Corporation
- Ward No. 33, Kolkata Municipal Corporation
- Ward No. 34, Kolkata Municipal Corporation
- Ward No. 35, Kolkata Municipal Corporation
- Ward No. 36, Kolkata Municipal Corporation
- Ward No. 37, Kolkata Municipal Corporation
- Ward No. 38, Kolkata Municipal Corporation
- Ward No. 39, Kolkata Municipal Corporation
- Ward No. 40, Kolkata Municipal Corporation
- Ward No. 41, Kolkata Municipal Corporation
- Ward No. 42, Kolkata Municipal Corporation
- Ward No. 43, Kolkata Municipal Corporation
- Ward No. 44, Kolkata Municipal Corporation
- Ward No. 45, Kolkata Municipal Corporation
- Ward No. 46, Kolkata Municipal Corporation
- Ward No. 47, Kolkata Municipal Corporation
- Ward No. 48, Kolkata Municipal Corporation
- Ward No. 49, Kolkata Municipal Corporation
- Ward No. 50, Kolkata Municipal Corporation
- Ward No. 51, Kolkata Municipal Corporation
- Ward No. 52, Kolkata Municipal Corporation
- Ward No. 53, Kolkata Municipal Corporation
- Ward No. 54, Kolkata Municipal Corporation
- Ward No. 55, Kolkata Municipal Corporation
- Ward No. 56, Kolkata Municipal Corporation
- Ward No. 57, Kolkata Municipal Corporation
- Ward No. 58, Kolkata Municipal Corporation
- Ward No. 59, Kolkata Municipal Corporation
- Ward No. 60, Kolkata Municipal Corporation
- Ward No. 61, Kolkata Municipal Corporation
- Ward No. 62, Kolkata Municipal Corporation
- Ward No. 63, Kolkata Municipal Corporation
- Ward No. 64, Kolkata Municipal Corporation
- Ward No. 65, Kolkata Municipal Corporation
- Ward No. 66, Kolkata Municipal Corporation
- Ward No. 67, Kolkata Municipal Corporation
- Ward No. 68, Kolkata Municipal Corporation
- Ward No. 69, Kolkata Municipal Corporation
- Ward No. 70, Kolkata Municipal Corporation
- Ward No. 71, Kolkata Municipal Corporation
- Ward No. 72, Kolkata Municipal Corporation
- Ward No. 73, Kolkata Municipal Corporation
- Ward No. 74, Kolkata Municipal Corporation
- Ward No. 75, Kolkata Municipal Corporation
- Ward No. 76, Kolkata Municipal Corporation
- Ward No. 77, Kolkata Municipal Corporation
- Ward No. 78, Kolkata Municipal Corporation
- Ward No. 79, Kolkata Municipal Corporation
- Ward No. 80, Kolkata Municipal Corporation
- Ward No. 81, Kolkata Municipal Corporation
- Ward No. 82, Kolkata Municipal Corporation
- Ward No. 83, Kolkata Municipal Corporation
- Ward No. 84, Kolkata Municipal Corporation
- Ward No. 85, Kolkata Municipal Corporation
- Ward No. 86, Kolkata Municipal Corporation
- Ward No. 87, Kolkata Municipal Corporation
- Ward No. 88, Kolkata Municipal Corporation
- Ward No. 89, Kolkata Municipal Corporation
- Ward No. 90, Kolkata Municipal Corporation
- Ward No. 91, Kolkata Municipal Corporation
- Ward No. 92, Kolkata Municipal Corporation
- Ward No. 93, Kolkata Municipal Corporation
- Ward No. 94, Kolkata Municipal Corporation
- Ward No. 95, Kolkata Municipal Corporation
- Ward No. 96, Kolkata Municipal Corporation
- Ward No. 97, Kolkata Municipal Corporation
- Ward No. 98, Kolkata Municipal Corporation
- Ward No. 99, Kolkata Municipal Corporation
- Ward No. 100, Kolkata Municipal Corporation
- Ward No. 101, Kolkata Municipal Corporation
- Ward No. 102, Kolkata Municipal Corporation
- Ward No. 103, Kolkata Municipal Corporation
- Ward No. 104, Kolkata Municipal Corporation
- Ward No. 105, Kolkata Municipal Corporation
- Ward No. 106, Kolkata Municipal Corporation
- Ward No. 107, Kolkata Municipal Corporation
- Ward No. 108, Kolkata Municipal Corporation
- Ward No. 109, Kolkata Municipal Corporation
- Ward No. 110, Kolkata Municipal Corporation
- Ward No. 111, Kolkata Municipal Corporation
- Ward No. 112, Kolkata Municipal Corporation
- Ward No. 113, Kolkata Municipal Corporation
- Ward No. 114, Kolkata Municipal Corporation
- Ward No. 115, Kolkata Municipal Corporation
- Ward No. 116, Kolkata Municipal Corporation
- Ward No. 117, Kolkata Municipal Corporation
- Ward No. 118, Kolkata Municipal Corporation
- Ward No. 119, Kolkata Municipal Corporation
- Ward No. 120, Kolkata Municipal Corporation
- Ward No. 121, Kolkata Municipal Corporation
- Ward No. 122, Kolkata Municipal Corporation
- Ward No. 123, Kolkata Municipal Corporation
- Ward No. 124, Kolkata Municipal Corporation
- Ward No. 125, Kolkata Municipal Corporation
- Ward No. 126, Kolkata Municipal Corporation
- Ward No. 127, Kolkata Municipal Corporation
- Ward No. 128, Kolkata Municipal Corporation
- Ward No. 129, Kolkata Municipal Corporation
- Ward No. 130, Kolkata Municipal Corporation
- Ward No. 131, Kolkata Municipal Corporation
- Ward No. 132, Kolkata Municipal Corporation
- Ward No. 133, Kolkata Municipal Corporation
- Ward No. 134, Kolkata Municipal Corporation
- Ward No. 135, Kolkata Municipal Corporation
- Ward No. 136, Kolkata Municipal Corporation
- Ward No. 137, Kolkata Municipal Corporation
- Ward No. 138, Kolkata Municipal Corporation
- Ward No. 139, Kolkata Municipal Corporation
- Ward No. 140, Kolkata Municipal Corporation
- Ward No. 141, Kolkata Municipal Corporation
- Ward No. 142, Kolkata Municipal Corporation
- Ward No. 143, Kolkata Municipal Corporation
- Ward No. 144, Kolkata Municipal Corporation
