= Joka, Kolkata =

Neighbourhood of Kolkata, India

Joka
- Town
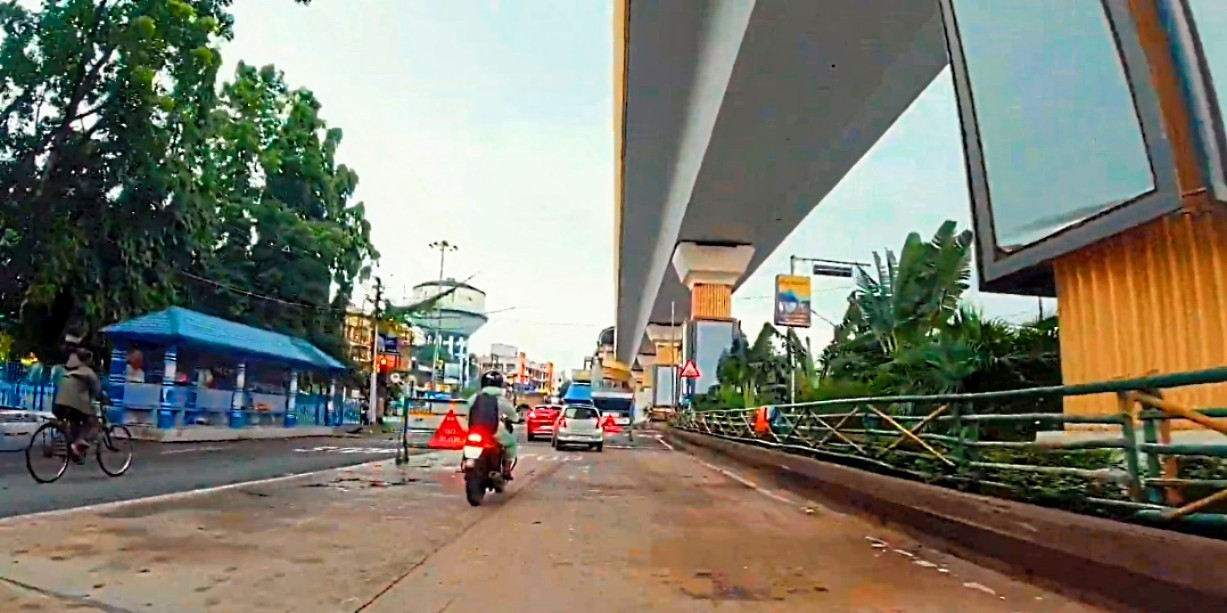
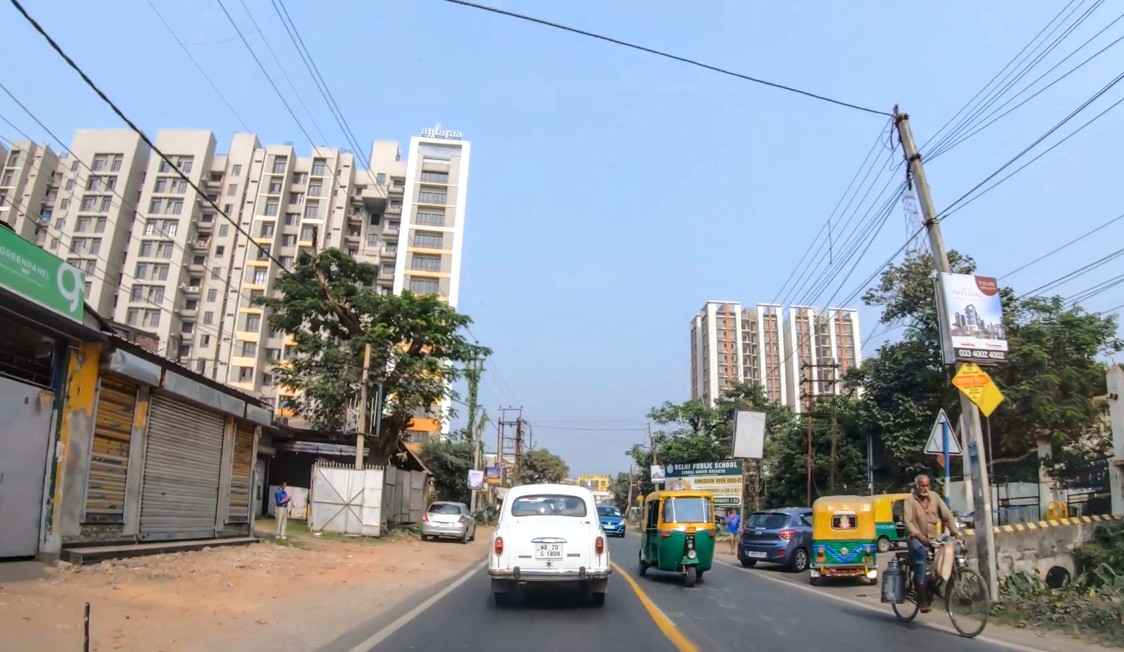
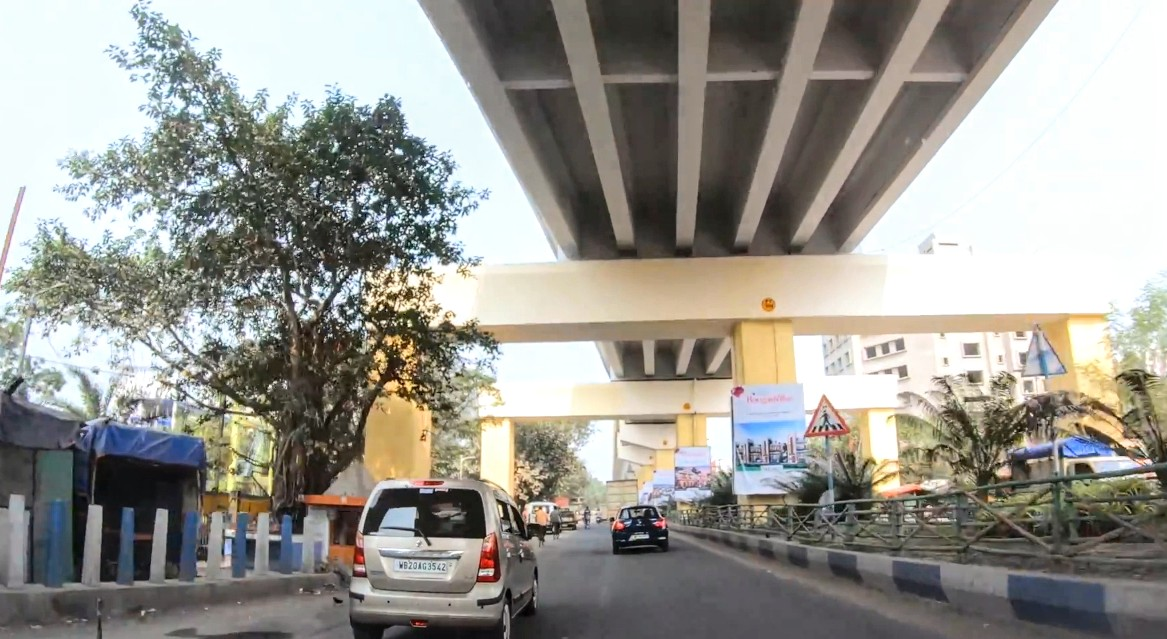
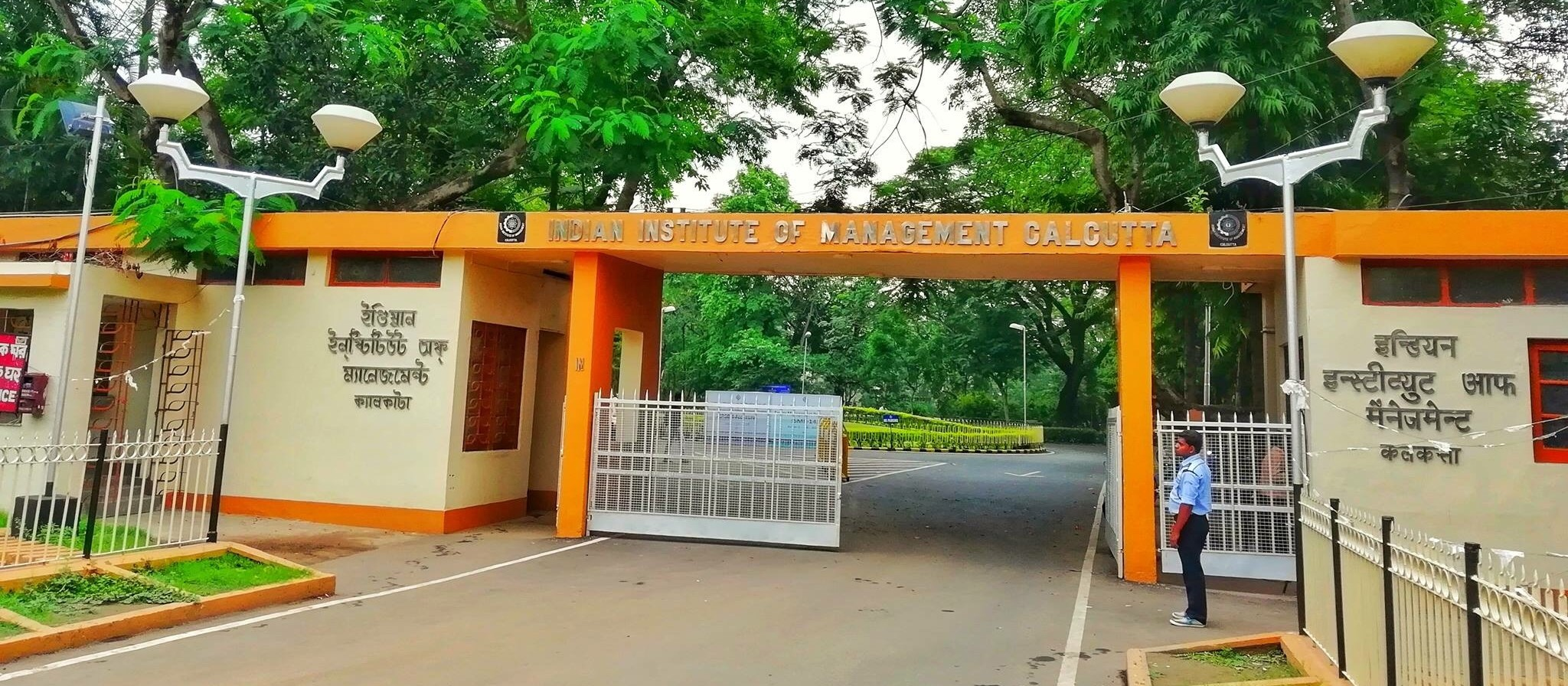
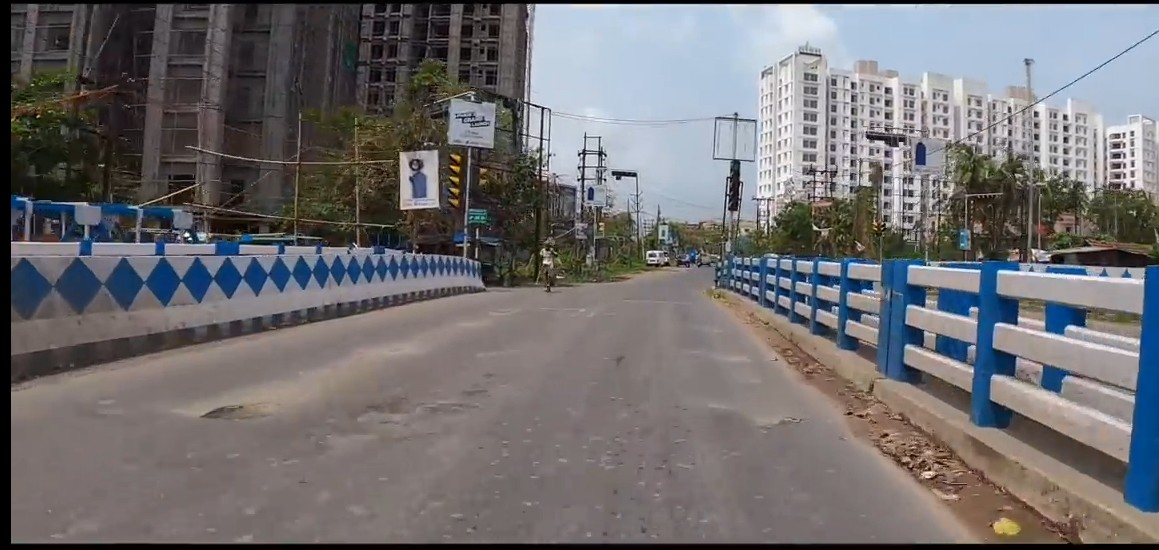
- 1:Joka Diamond Park, D.H Road 2:View Of High Rising Apartments in Joka 3:D.H. Road, Kolkata 4:IIM Calcutta 5:Charial Khal Bridge

- Location in Kolkata
- Coordinates: 22.453°N 88.301°E
- Country: India
- State: West Bengal
- City: Kolkata
- District: South 24 Parganas
- Metro station: Joka
- Municipal Corporation: Kolkata Municipal Corporation
- KMC wards: 142, 143, 144
- Time zone: UTC+5:30 (IST)
- PIN: 700 104
- Area code: +91 33
- Lok Sabha constituency: Kolkata Dakshin
- Vidhan Sabha constituency: Behala Purba

Joka is a locality of South Kolkata in South 24 Parganas district in West Bengal, India. It is a part of greater Behala region. Joka is located at the southern fringe of the city and marks the limit of KMC area. It is known for Indian Institute of Management Calcutta and ESIC Medical College and Hospital.

== Administration ==
Joka and part of Pailan-Daulatpur (adjoining area of Joka) are a part of the Kolkata Municipal Corporation. The area is under jurisdiction of the Haridevpur Police Station and Thakurpukur Police Station of South West Division (Behala Division) of Kolkata Police.

== Geography ==
Joka is bordered by Thakurpukur to the north, Pailan to the south, Asuti Maheshtala to the west and Nepalgunge, Rania to the East.

Joka composed of many small areas like Diamond Park, Nabapally, 22 Bigha, Yani Sarani, Check Post, Sri Bardhan Pally, Bardhan Pally, Hanspukur, Rasapunjo, Kalua, Sonar Bangla etc.

== Transport ==
Joka is well connected with the rest of Kolkata by the 6 laned Diamond Harbour Road (NH 12) and 4 laned James Long Sarani.

There is another road called "Bakhrahat Road" which connects joka with some parts of South 24 Parganas like Bakhrahat, Bibirhat, Nodakhali, Dakshin raypur, Amtala, Burul, Pujali, Budge Budge etc.

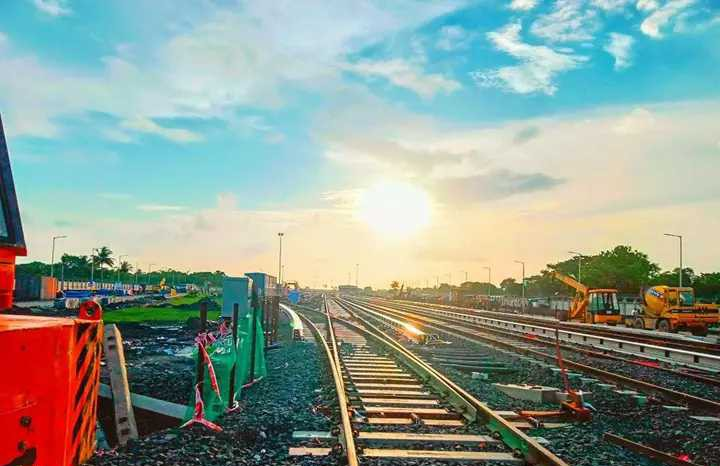
Joka Metro Carshed, Kolkata

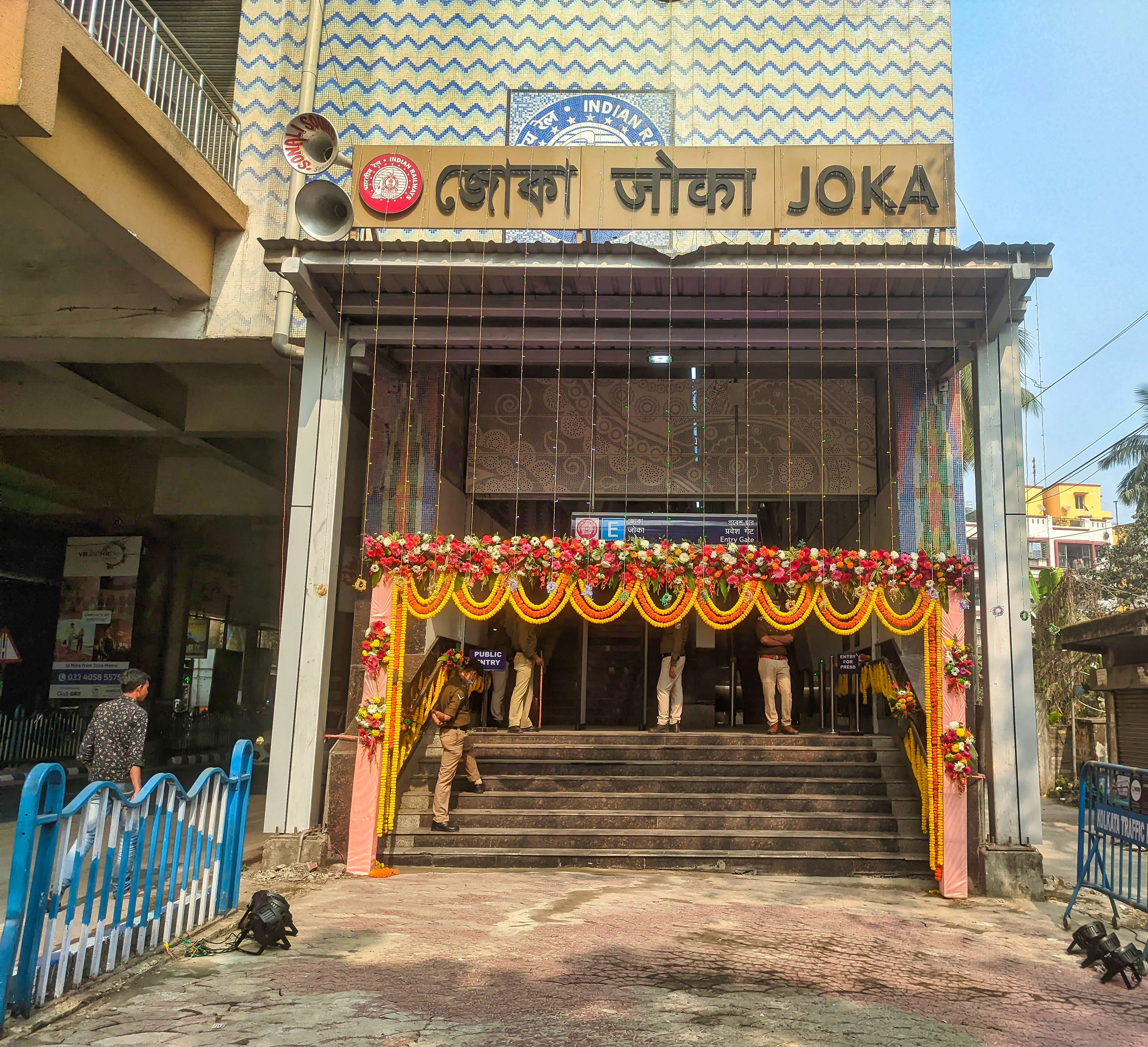
Joka metro station

Joka-Majherhat metro stretch of Joka-Esplanade metro line (Purple Line) is operational as of November 2024.

The old Joka Tram depot is now closed and tram services no longer exist.

Bus routes include:-

=== WBTC bus routes ===
- AC4B Joka - New Town (via Kabardanga, Tollygunge, Rashbehari, Gariahat, Ruby Hospital, Science City, SDF)
- AC12D Howrah Station - Joka
- AC52 Howrah Station - Amtala
- S3W Joka - Ecospace (Aliah University) (via Thakurpukur, Behala, Taratala, New Alipore, Chetla, Rashbehari, Gariahat, Ruby Hospital, Science City, SDF, New Town, Narkelbagan)

=== Private Bus ===
- 12C Pailan - Howrah Station (via Behala, B.N.R.)
- 12C/1A Konchowki - Howrah Station
- 12C/1B Pailan - Howrah Station (via Kabardanga, Haridevpur, Tollygunge, Rabindra Sadan)
- 83 Falta - Babughat
- 210 Raichak - Esplanade (Express Bus)
- 235 Amtala - Salt Lake Karunamoyee
- 75 Raipur - Babughat (Via Bakhrahat Road, Thakurpukur bazar, Behala, khidirpore, Esplanade)
- SD8 Bibirhat - Nandi Bagan (Via Bakhrahat Road, Thakurpukur bazar, Mominpur, Hazra, Gariahat, Ballygunge)

=== Mini Bus ===
- 11A Diamond Park - Howrah Maidan
- 131 Joka Ruby Hospital
- Thakurpukur - Sealdah (Bus starts from Diamond Park)
- Thakurpukur - Bagbazar (Bus starts from Diamond Park)

=== SD Bus Route ===
- SD5 Sonarpur - Khariberia
- SD9 Esplanade - Noorpur
- SD9/1 Esplanade - Noorpur
- SD14 Taratala - Sahararhat
- SD16 Sirakole - Mukundapur via Ajoy Nagar Survey Park Santoshpur, Jadavpur, Ballygunj Phari, Shishu Mangal Hospital, Kalighat, Hazra, Majherhut, Mint, Behala, Taratala.
- SD18 Esplanade - Diamond Harbour/South Bishnupur/Raidighi
- SD19 Esplanade - Patharpratima / Gangadharpur
- SD22/1 Esplanade - Nainan Sector 4
- SD27 Dostipur - Akrafatak
- SD31 Taratala - Jhinki Hat
- SD76 Amtala - Ruby Hospital
- SD4 Garfa - Thakurpukur via Palbazar, Jadavpur Railway Station. Jadavpur 8B Bus stand, Rashbihari, Mudiali, Tollygunj Phari, Mahabir tala, Taratala.

=== CTC Bus ===
- C8 Joka - Barasat via Kabardanga, Haridevpur, Tollygunge, Rashbehari, Gariahat, Ruby Hospital, Science City, SDF, New Town, Narkelbagan, Eco Park, City Centre 2, Airport, Madhyamgram
- C37 Amtala - Howrah Station
- C38 Joka - Howrah Station
- C46 Nabanna - Baruipur via Khidderpore, Behala, Thakurpukur, Amtala, Sirakole, Dhamuah, Surjapur, Sarberia
- E45 Joka - Digha via Kabardanga, Haridevpur, Tollygunge, Rashbehari, Esplanade, Santragachi, Dhulagarh, Mecheda, Nandakumar, Henria, Contai, Ramnagar

=== VS Series (WBSTC AC Volvo Bus) ===
- VS6 Esplanade - Diamond Harbour

=== WBSTC Non AC ===
- ST25 Esplanade - Ramganga
- ST26 Esplanade - Usthi
- ST27 Esplanade - Kakdwip/Patharpratima Bazar
- ST28 Esplanade - Namkhana
- ST29 Esplanade - Dhola
- ST32 Esplanade - Bakkhali
- ST37 Esplanade - Raidighi

=== Ola Shuttle ===
- Falta - Kasba
- Joka - Infospace
- Joka - Ecospace
- Joka - Sector 5
- Joka - Salt Lake (to Yuba Bharati Krirangan during U17 FIFA World Cup 2017)

=== Auto Rickshaw ===
- Joka - Taratala
- Joka - Majerhat
- Thakurpukur - Amtala
- Thakurpukur - Pailan

== Economy ==
In accordance with the recent developments in Joka, mainly Joka-BBD Bagh metro, the area has started to develop rapidly. Projects like Genexx Valley, Imperial Riddhi Siddhi have come up, providing housing facilities. Joka has also seen a rise in Retail and fast food chains. ESIC hospital is also located in Joka, serving the residents in the area with all the medical facilities.

== Education ==
Joka has the Indian Institute Of Management Calcutta (IIMC), India's first IIM established by Govt. Of India in the year 1961.

Schools in the area include Vivekananda Mission School, Pailan World School and Kendriya Vidyalaya, Kolkata Model School, St Mary's Convent School, Children Academy High School, Joka perfect school, St. Gregorios School, Gurukul Vidya Mandir Secondary School, Kalua Primary School, Ideal Mission School, St. Andrews Public School, El Bethel School.

Ministry of Labour & Employment has started a Medical College in this area (in the campus of erstwhile ESIC Joka Model Hospital) since 2013.

== Notable residents ==
- Bir Bahadur Chettri (Gold Medalist in Field hockey at the 1980 Summer Olympics)
- Srabanti Chatterjee (Tollywood film actress)
- Soham Chakraborty (Tollywood film actor)
