= Haridevpur =

Neighbourhood in Kolkata in West Bengal, India

- Neighbourhood in Kolkata (Calcutta)
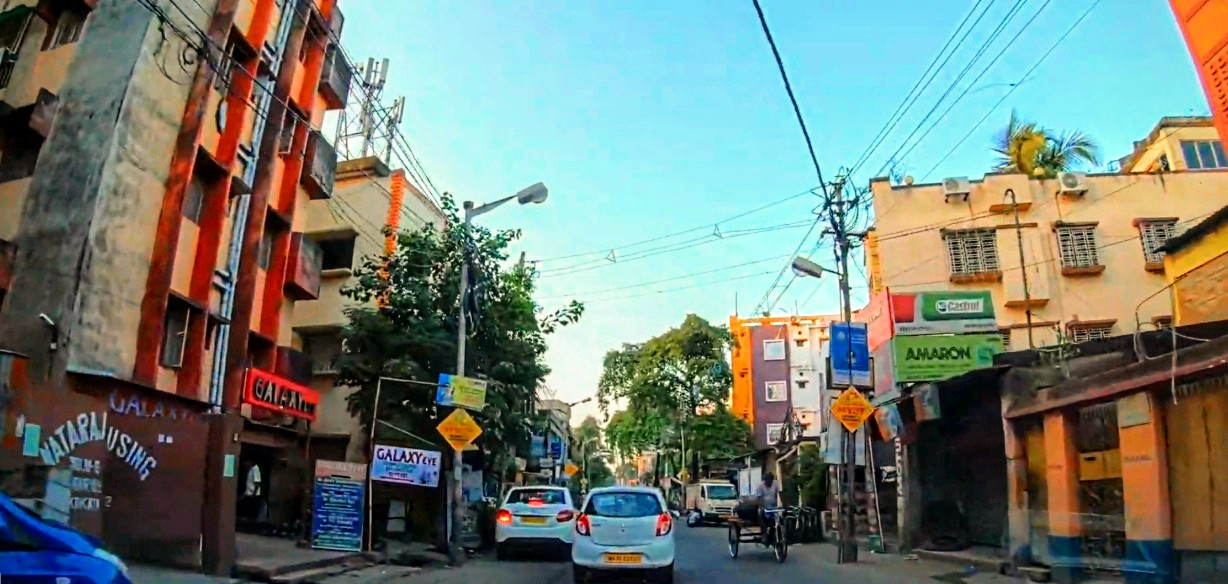
- Haridevpur, M.G Road

- Location in Kolkata
- Coordinates: 22.467675°N 88.336694°E
- Country: India
- State: West Bengal
- District: Kolkata
- City: Kolkata
- Metro Station: Mahanayak Uttam Kumar
- Municipal Corporation: Kolkata Municipal Corporation
- KMC ward: 122, 143, 144

Population
  - Total: For population see linked KMC ward page
- Time zone: UTC+5:30 (IST)
- PIN: 700082, 700104, 700041
- Area code: +91 33
- Lok Sabha constituency: Kolkata Dakshin, Jadavpur (Previously)
- Vidhan Sabha constituency: Behala Purba

Haridevpur is a locality of South Kolkata in West Bengal, India. It is a part of Tollygunge area. The area is situated off the Mahatma Gandhi Road and is a part of Behala Purba and Tollygunge assembly constituency.

== Geography ==
=== Police district ===
Haridevpur police station is part of the South West division of Kolkata Police. It is located at 559 Mahatma Gandhi Road, Kolkata-700082.

Behala Women police station, located at the same address as above, covers all police districts under the jurisdiction of the South West division i.e. Sarsuna, Taratala, Behala, Parnasree, Thakurpukur and Haridevpur.

Jadavpur, Thakurpukur, Behala, Purba Jadavpur, Tiljala, Regent Park, Metiabruz, Nadial and Kasba police stations were transferred from South 24 Parganas to Kolkata in 2011. Except Metiabruz, all the police stations were split into two. The new police stations are Parnasree, Haridevpur, Garfa, Patuli, Survey Park, Pragati Maidan, Bansdroni and Rajabagan.

== Transport ==
Haridevpur is on Mahatma Gandhi Road linking Thakurpukur and Joka with Tollygunge.

=== Bus ===
==== Private Bus ====
- 40A Julpia - Babughat
- 40B Thakurpukur - Babughat
- 12C/1B Pailan - Howrah Station

==== Mini Bus ====
- S117 Kalitala - Howrah Station

==== WBTC Bus ====
- C8 Joka - Barasat
- M16A Thakurpukur - Tollygunge
- S4C Haridevpur - Howrah Station
- AC4B Joka - New Town Bus Stand
