= Sankar Sikder =

Member of the West Bengal Legislative Assembly

Member of the West Bengal Legislative Assembly
- Incumbent
- Assumed office 13 May 2026
- Preceded by: Ratna Chaterjee
- Constituency: Behala Purba

Personal details
- Born: 1979 (age 46–47 years), West Bengal, India
- Party: Bharatiya Janata Party
- Profession: Politician

Sankar Sikder (born 1979) is a politician from West Bengal. He is a member of West Bengal Legislative Assembly, from Behala Purba Assembly constituency. He is a member of Bharatiya Janata Party.

== Member of the West Bengal Legislative Assembly (2026 - Incumbent) ==
Sikder assumed office of Member of the West Bengal Legislative Assembly representing the Behala Purba Assembly Constituency replacing Ratna Chaterjee on 13 May 2026 after he was elected on 4 May 2026 defeating Subhasish Chakraborty and Nilay Majumder.
