= Kabardanga =

- Neighbourhood in Kolkata (Calcutta)
- Location in Kolkata
- Coordinates: 22.46346275°N 88.33320765°E
- Country: India
- State: West Bengal
- City: Kolkata
- District: Kolkata
- Metro Station: Thakurpukur, Tollygunge, Kudghat
- Municipal Corporation: Kolkata Municipal Corporation
- KMC ward: 142,143

Population
  - Total: For population see linked KMC ward page
- Time zone: UTC+5:30 (IST)
- PIN: 700 104, 700 082, 700 093
- Area code: +91 33
- Lok Sabha constituency: Kolkata Dakshin
- Vidhan Sabha constituency: Behala Purba

Kabardanga is a locality in South Kolkata in West Bengal, India. It is a part of Kolkata Municipal Corporation.It is a locality of partly Behala area and partly Tollygunge area.

== Geography ==
Kabardanga is a village in kolkata.The main road of the area is Mahatma Gandhi road, which connects Thakurpukur/Joka to Tollygunge. The area can also be reached from Behala via Motilal Gupta road or Raja Ram Mohan Roy road by crossing the narrow streets of sodpur/Haridevpur.

== Transport ==
=== Bus ===
- 12C/1B
- 40B
- Kalitala Mini
- C8

=== Auto Rickshaw ===
- Kabardanga - Thakurpukur
- Kabardanga - Tollygunge Metro
- Kabardanga - Nepalgunj hat

=== Metro ===
Nearest Metro stations are:-

- Thakurpukur Metro Station
- Mahanayak Uttam Kumar metro station (Tollygunge)
- Netaji Metro Station (Kudghat)

== Administration ==
The area is under the administration of Haridevpur police station of South west division (Behala Division) of Kolkata Police. The whole M.G Road(3A bus stand x-ing to Tollygunge Karunamoyee) is administered by Thakurpukur Traffic guard.

The kabardanga locality partly falls under Joka(700104) pincode, partly under Haridevpur(700082) pincode and partly under Purba Putiary(700093) pincode.

It is a part of Behala purba(700104,700082) and Tollygunge(700093) Assembly constituency.
