= Sovan Chatterjee =

Indian politician

Sovan Chatterjee শোভন চট্টোপাধ্যায়
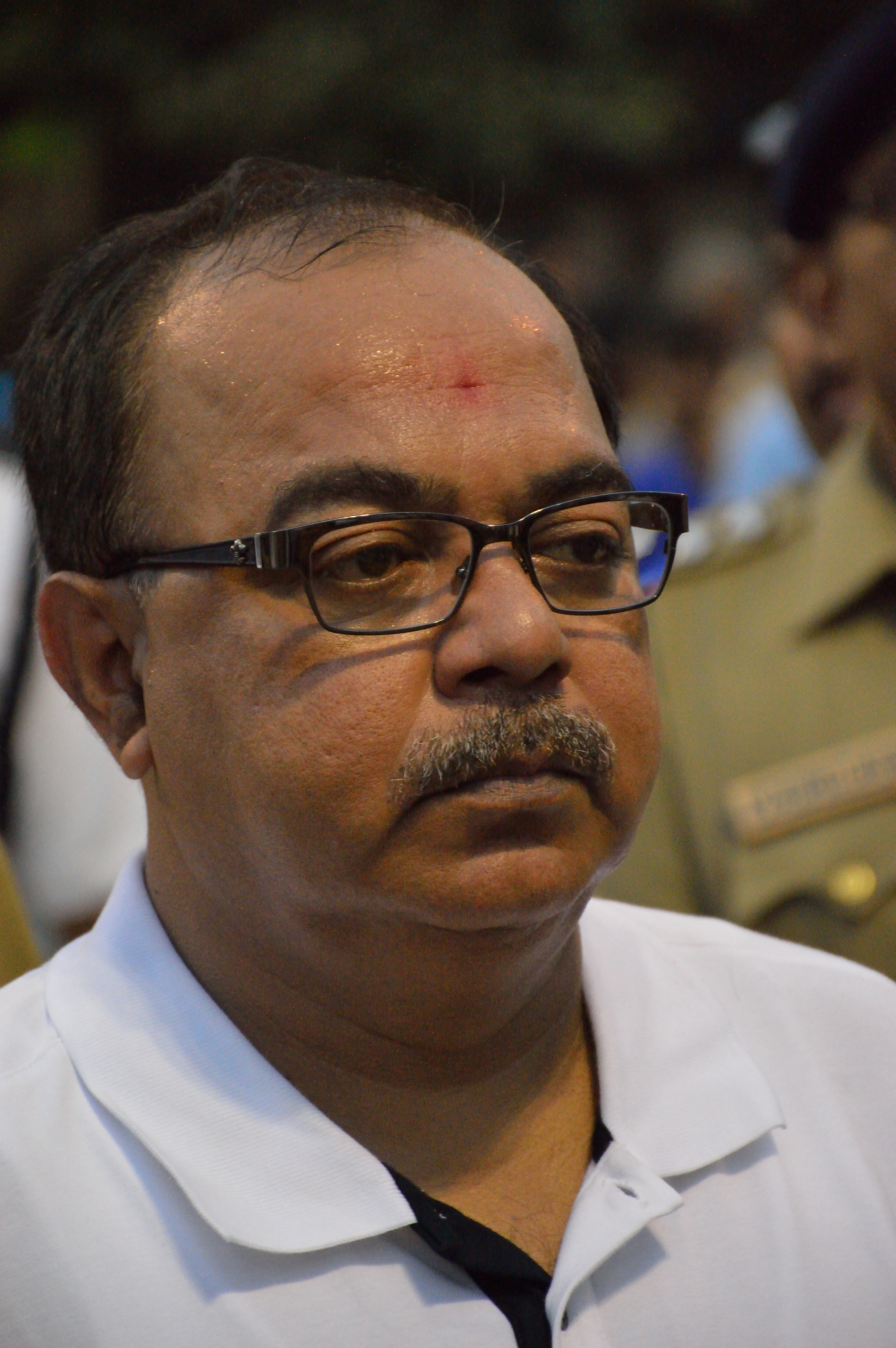

Chairman of New Town Kolkata Development Authority
- Incumbent
- Assumed office 17 October 2025
- Preceded by: Alapan Bandyopadhyay

37th Mayor of Kolkata
- In office 16 June 2010 – 22 November 2018
- Deputy: Farzana Alam (2010-15); Iqbal Ahmed (2015-18)
- Preceded by: Bikash Ranjan Bhattacharya
- Succeeded by: Firhad Hakim

Minister of Fire & Engineering Government of West Bengal
- In office 2016–2018
- Preceded by: Kumkum Chakraborti
- Succeeded by: Sujit Bose
- Constituency: Behala Purba

Councillor, Kolkata Municipal Corporation
- In office 1985–2022
- Preceded by: Sova Ghosh
- Succeeded by: Ratna Chatterjee
- Constituency: Ward No. 131

Personal details
- Born: 7 July 1964 (age 62) Calcutta, West Bengal, India
- Party: Trinamool Congress (1998–2019, 2025–present); Bharatiya Janata Party (2019–2021); Indian National Congress (1985–1998)
- Spouse: Ratna Chatterjee (2001-2018)

Sovan Chatterjee (born 7 July 1964) is an Indian politician from West Bengal. He is a former member of Indian National Congress, Trinamool Congress, and the Bharatiya Janata Party. He has also served as the Mayor of Kolkata. Chatterjee served as a Kolkata Municipal Corporation (KMC) councilor since 1985. In 2019, he joined Bharatiya Janata Party, and left in 2021. He rejoined TMC officially on 3 November 2025.

== Political career ==
Chatterjee, a councillor in the KMC since 1985, also served as a mayor in council from 2000 to 2005, of the corporation. Chatterjee won the Behala Purba seat in the 2011 West Bengal Assembly election, which he retained in 2016.

=== Mayor of Kolkata ===
In 2010, he was appointed the mayor of Kolkata by his party Trinamool Congress, with Farzana Alam being appointed his deputy. He resigned from the mayor post on 22 November 2018.

=== Cabinet Minister ===
Chatterjee was made a cabinet minister in 2016. Former mayor Bikash Ranjan Bhattacharya said that there was no provision in the law that prevents a mayor from holding a ministerial berth. With the decline in supply of cattle, India's first fully automated slaughterhouse (in Tangra area) was shut down in May 2017. Chatterjee reacted by saying that he would examine the matter.

In December 2016, Chatterjee became the first mayor of any city in India to get Z-plus security cover (the highest level of security cover in India). In that category, he would get security cover by National Security Guard commandos.

In November 2014, Chatterjee was announced as the mayoral candidate of his party for the civic polls which were to be held in 2015. He was reappointed the mayor of the city in May, as his party won the polls.

=== Career In BJP ===
On 22 November 2018, he resigned from the mayor post of Kolkata Municipal Corporation. He later joined BJP on 14 August 2019. He was the observer of Kolkata Zone for West Bengal Bharatiya Janata Party. He left BJP in 2021.

=== Rejoining TMC ===
On 15 October 2025, he met with West Bengal CM and TMC supremo Mamata Banerjee in Derjeeling . He had also met Banerjee's nephew Abhishek Banerjee few week before. Two days after, on October 15, he was appointed as the Chairman of Newtown Kolkata Development Authority [NKDA] by a Government order. After this, a rumor spread about his rejoining in TMC. Lastly he officially rejoined TMC on 3 November 2025.

== Personal life ==
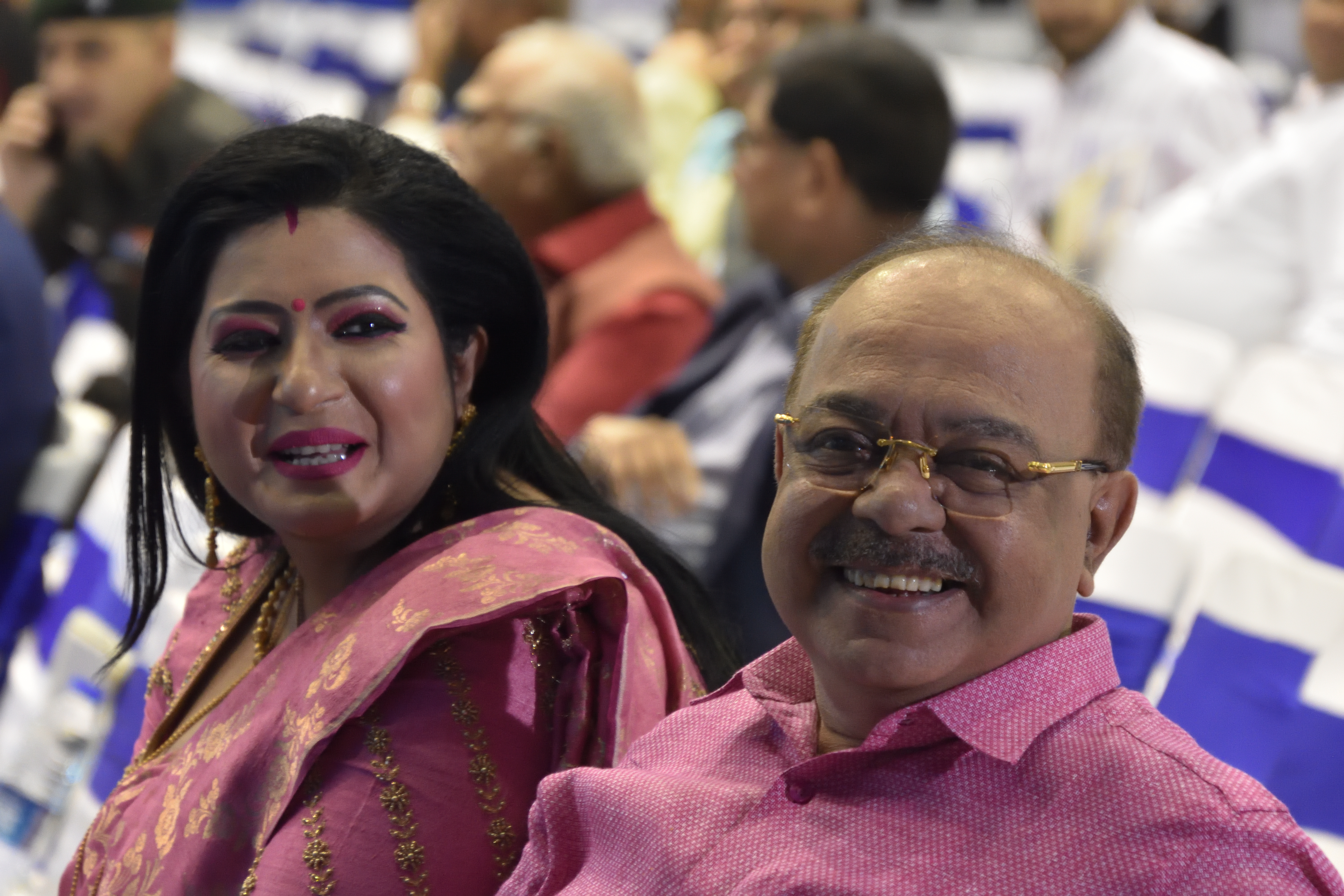
Sovan Chatterjee and Baisakhi Banerjee at the 29th Kolkata International Film Festival, 2023

Sovan Chatterjee married Ratna, daughter of Dulal Chandra Das, in 2001. They have a son, Saptarshi.

Since 2018, Chatterjee has been estranged from his wife. He filed for divorce, citing her alleged extramarital affair with her business partner Abhijit Ganguly, which Ratna denied. Ratna has refused to grant Sovan a divorce. Citing threats to his life from Ratna, Sovan left his Behala residence and now lives in a Golpark flat with Baisakhi Banerjee, a university lecturer and member of TMC's teachers' unit, with whom he has been having an extramarital affair since 2009. Ratna has blamed Baisaikhi (who left her husband within two months of their marriage to live with Sovan) for instigating trouble in their married life. Sovan was reportedly displeased when Dulal Chandra Das was fielded as TMC's candidate for bypolls to the Maheshtala seat in 2018, which he interpreted as party supremo Mamata Banerjee siding with his wife. In November 2018, Mamata Banerjee also made Sovan resign as a minister in her cabinet and as mayor of Kolkata Municipal Corporation because his marital problems were affecting his work, which caused him to further distance himself from the party. In August 2019, Sovan and Baisakhi joined BJP, while Ratna continued to remain in TMC. Sovan has not been very active in the party, citing its lack of respect for Baisakhi. In the 2021 state elections, TMC fielded Ratna Chatterjee as its candidate from Sovan's erstwhile seat of East Behala. Sovan wanted to be fielded there as the BJP candidate, but the party refused and instead planned to field him in the neighbouring seat of West Behala. Citing this and the party's refusal to make Baisakhi a candidate in the elections, Sovan quit the BJP alongside Baisakhi on 14 March 2021, two weeks before polling began.

After Sovan was arrested over the Narada sting operation, Baisakhi was recorded by the media crying before the security guards of Alipore Jail to allow her to meet him. They refused on the grounds that she was not related to him. Sovan refused to meet with Ratna, who was allowed to meet him in jail.

Sovan has made Baisakhi his legal heir, displacing his wife and son.

== Views ==
=== Bhangar Power Grid ===
Chatterjee supports the restoration work of building the Bhangar Power Grid, which was stopped due to the protests of villagers over the acquisition of land. He said that outsiders with vested interests were hindering development.

=== Water crisis ===
In May 2017, there were reports of water crisis in South Kolkata. Areas affected included Garden Reach, Watgunj, Kidderpore. Left Front councillors boycotted a monthly meeting of the Kolkata Municipal Corporation to protest against the body's inability to solve the issue. About the complaints, Chatterjee said that the opposition was making a "mountain out of a molehill".

== Controversies ==
On 17 May 2021, he, along with senior minister in the Mamata Banerjee cabinet, Subrata Mukherjee, MLA and former minister Madan Mitra and Firhad Hakim were arrested by the Central Bureau of Investigation from their house in connection with the Narada sting operation.
