= Ratna Chatterjee =

Indian politician

Ratna Chatterjee (born 1972) is an Indian politician from West Bengal. She is a member of the West Bengal Legislative Assembly from Behala Purba Assembly constituency in South 24 Parganas district. She won the 2021 West Bengal Legislative Assembly election representing the All India Trinamool Congress party.

== Early life and education ==
Chatterjee is from Behala Purba, South 24 Parganas district, West Bengal. She married Sovan Chatterjee, former minister and mayor of Kolkata. She runs her own businesses including a diagnostic centre, a hotel and a fitness studio. She completed her bachelor's degree in political science in 1995 at a college affiliated with University of Calcutta.

== Career ==
Chatterjee won from Behala Purba Assembly constituency representing the All India Trinamool Congress in the 2021 West Bengal Legislative Assembly election. She polled 110,968 votes and defeated his nearest rival, Payel Sarkar of the Bharatiya Janata Party, by a margin of 37,428 votes. In 2016, her former husband Sovan Chatterjee won this seat.
