= Ward No. 143, Kolkata Municipal Corporation =

Ward No. 143
- Kolkata Municipal Corporation
- Interactive Map Outlining Ward No. 143
- Location in Kolkata
- Coordinates: 22.456589°N 88.321242°E
- Country: India
- State: West Bengal
- City: Kolkata
- Neighbourhoods: Joka, Haridevpur
- Reservation: Women(Open)
- Parliamentary constituency: Kolkata Dakshin
- Assembly constituency: Behala Purba
- Borough: 16
- Time zone: UTC+5:30 (IST)
- Area code: +91 33

Ward No. 143, Kolkata Municipal Corporation is an administrative division of the Kolkata Municipal Corporation in Borough No. 16, covering parts of the Joka and some parts of Haridevpur neighbourhood in the Indian state of West Bengal.

== History ==
Wards No. 142, 143 and 144, in Joka, were created in 2012 and subsequently brought under Borough No. 16. The area of the newly created wards was earlier part of Joka I and Joka II gram panchayats.

Location of Ward No. 143 in Kolkata Ward Map

== Election highlights ==
The ward forms a city municipal corporation council electoral constituency and is a part of Behala Purba (Vidhan Sabha constituency)

Election year	Constituency	Name of councillor	Party affililiation
2015	Ward No. 143	Indrajit Bhattacharya	All India Trinamool Congress
