= Ward No. 122, Kolkata Municipal Corporation =

Ward No. 122
- Kolkata Municipal Corporation
- Interactive Map Outlining Ward No. 122
- Location in Kolkata
- Coordinates: 22.483222°N 88.328389°E
- Country: India
- State: West Bengal
- City: Kolkata
- Neighbourhoods: Behala (Sukanta Pally-Sodpur-Kazipara), Haridevpur
- Reservation: Women(Open)
- Parliamentary constituency: Kolkata Dakshin
- Assembly constituency: Behala Purba
- Borough: 13

Population (2011)
  - Total: 39,198
- Time zone: UTC+5:30 (IST)
- PIN: 700 082
- Area code: +91 33

Ward No. 122, Kolkata Municipal Corporation is an administrative division of Kolkata Municipal Corporation in Borough No. 13, covering parts of Behala (Sukanta Pally-Sodpur-Kazipara) and Haridevpur neighbourhoods in the Indian state of West Bengal.

== History ==
The establishment and evolution of Kolkata Municipal Corporation followed a long process starting from around the middle of the 19th century. The Municipal Consolidation Act of 1888 and certain steps taken thereafter saw the addition of peripheral areas in the eastern and southern parts of the city to the corporation area. In 1888, there were 75 commissioners, 50 of whom were elected, 15 appointed by the government and 10 nominated from bodies like Chambers of Commerce, Trades Associations and the Port Commissioners. The Calcutta Municipal Act of 1923 brought about important changes. The adjacent municipalities of Cossipore, Chitpore, Manicktola and Garden Reach, as well as the New Dock Extension area, were amalgamated with Kolkata. Garden Reach was later taken out.

Post-independence developments saw the introduction of adult franchise in municipal elections in 1962. The number of wards increased from 75 to 100. Tollygunge was merged with Kolkata in 1953. The Calcutta Municipal Corporation Act 1980, which came into effect in 1984, extended the boundaries of Kolkata by including South Suburban, Garden Reach and Jadavpur municipalities in Kolkata. With the addition of Joka to Kolkata, the number of wards rose to 144.

== Geography ==
Ward No. 122 is bordered on the north by Raja Rammohan Roy Road, Motilal Gupta Road, Sodepur 2nd Lane and Banamali Banerjee Road; on the east by Mahatma Gandhi Road and Keorapukur Khal; on the south by Dhalipara Road; and on the west by Kalipada Mukherjee Road, Hem Chandra Mukherjee Road, Ishan Ghosh Road and a line drawn in continuation on the south up to Dhalipara Road.

Location of Ward No. 122 in Kolkata Ward Map

The ward is served by Haridevpur police station of Kolkata Police.

Behala Women police station covers all police districts under the jurisdiction of the South West division, i.e. Sarsuna, Taratala, Behala, Parnasree, Thakurpukur and Haridevpur.

== Demographics ==
As per the 2011 Census of India, Ward No. 122, Kolkata Municipal Corporation, had a total population of 39,198, of which 19,906 (51%) were males and 19,292 (49%) were females. Population below 6 years was 2,797. The total number of literates in Ward No. 122 was 33,810 (92.88% of the population over 6 years).

Kolkata is the second most literate district in West Bengal. The literacy rate of Kolkata district has increased from 53.0% in 1951 to 86.3% in the 2011 census.

See also – List of West Bengal districts ranked by literacy rate

Literacy in KMC wards

North Kolkata
Ward No. 1 – 86.12%
Ward No. 2 – 94.24%
Ward No. 3 – 86.74%
Ward No. 4 – 89.27%
Ward No. 5 – 90.32%
Ward No. 6 – 81.12%
Ward No. 7 – 87.65%
Ward No. 8 – 93.57%
Ward No. 9 – 91.60%
Ward No. 10 – 92.38%
Ward No. 11 – 87.96%
Ward No. 12 – 84.95%
Ward No. 13 – 83.39%
Ward No. 14 – 87.87%
Ward No. 15 – 88.89%
Ward No. 16 – 88.62%
Ward No. 17 – 92.30%
Ward No. 18 – 78.72%
Ward No. 19 – 89.29%
Ward No. 20 – 85.93%
Ward No. 21 – 78.12%
Ward No. 22 – 85.07%
Ward No. 23 – 71.14%
Ward No. 24 – 73.16%
Ward No. 25 – 85.49%
Ward No. 26 – 82.34%
Ward No. 27 – 88.19%
Ward No. 28 – 79.39%
Ward No. 29 – 70.69%
Ward No. 30 – 88.71%
Ward No. 31 – 88.28%
Ward No. 32 – 75.73%
Ward No. 33 – 91.17%
Central Kolkata
Ward No. 34 – 92.79%
Ward No. 35 – 91.44%
Ward No. 36 – 66.34%
Ward No. 37 – 79.12%
Ward No. 38 – 85.77%
Ward No. 39 – 73.27%
Ward No. 40 – 88.14%
Ward No. 41 – 83.53%
Ward No. 42 – 75.02%
Ward No. 43 – 79.52%
Ward No. 44 – 79.09%
Ward No. 45 – 74.69%
Ward No. 46 – 85.38%
Ward No. 47 – 87.87%
Ward No. 48 – 82.04%
Ward No. 49 – 65.51%
Ward No. 50 – 88.70%
Ward No. 51 – 93.01%
Ward No. 52 – 86.18%
Ward No. 53 – 89.49%
Ward No. 54 – 82.10%
Ward No. 55 – 84.84%
Ward No. 56 – 85.53%
Ward No. 57 – 80.20%
Ward No. 58 – 74.35%
Ward No. 59 – 80.39%
Ward No. 60 – 74.04%
Ward No. 61 – 80.54%
Ward No. 62 – 86.04%
Ward No. 63 – 84.39%
Ward No. 64 – 85.21%
Ward No. 65 – 81.60%
South Kolkata
Ward No. 66 – 80.95%
Ward No. 67 – 89.52%
Ward No. 68 – 90.86%
Ward No. 69 – 86.07%
Ward No. 70 – 94.20%
Ward No. 71 – 92.01%
Ward No. 72 – 90.06%
Ward No. 73 – 89.28%
Ward No. 74 – 84.56%
Ward No. 75 – 80.27%
Ward No. 76 – 88.40%
Ward No. 77 – 83.84%
Ward No. 78 – 83.00%
Ward No. 79 – 81.96%
Ward No. 80 – 71.89%
Ward No. 81 – 85.14%
Ward No. 82 – 84.82%
Ward No. 83 – 85.63%
Ward No. 84 – 85.71%
Ward No. 85 – 88.19%
Ward No. 86 – 89.61%
Ward No. 87 – 90.26%
Ward No. 88 – 85.09%
Ward No. 89 – 92.40%
Ward No. 90 – 84.60%
Ward No. 91 – 90.57%
Ward No. 92 – 93.53%
Ward No. 93 – 91.30%
Ward No. 94 – 89.11%
Ward No. 95 – 95.61%
Ward No. 96 – 96.57%
Ward No. 97 – 94.60%
Ward No. 98 – 96.24%
Ward No. 99 – 95.79%
Ward No. 100 – 95.98%
Ward No. 101 – 95.36%
Ward No. 102 – 93.53%
Ward No. 103 – 94.77%
Ward No. 104 – 96.03%
Ward No. 105 – 93.86%
Ward No. 106 – 92.97%
Ward No. 107 – 90.06%
Ward No. 108 – 80.74%
Ward No. 109 – 85.49%
Ward No. 110 – 91.35%
Ward No. 111 – 93.36%
Ward No. 112 – 92.50%
Ward No. 113 – 92.18%
Ward No. 114 – 91.13%
Ward No. 115 – 95.53%
Ward No. 116 – 86.91%
Ward No. 117 – 86.53%
Ward No. 118 – 90.04%
Ward No. 119 – 94.04%
Ward No. 120 – 92.15%
Ward No. 121 – 91.86%
Ward No. 122 – 92.88%
Ward No. 123 – 93.42%
Ward No. 124 – 92.55%
Ward No. 125 – 92.50%
Ward No. 126 – 93.78%
Ward No. 127 – 91.82%
Ward No. 128 – 92.67%
Ward No. 129 – 92.56%
Ward No. 130 – 95.55%
Ward No. 131 – 93.48%
Ward No. 132 – 90.30%
Ward No. 133 – 83.48%
Ward No. 134 – 73.75%
Ward No. 135 – 75.75%
Ward No. 136 – 85.01%
Ward No. 137 – 79.16%
Ward No. 138 – 78.67%
Ward No. 139 – 77.56%
Ward No. 140 – 79.93%
Ward No. 141 – 75.15%
Note: The regional distribution
is a broad one and
there is some overlapping
2011 Census: Ward-Wise

Primary Census Abstract Data

Census data about mother tongue and religion is not available at the ward level. For district level information see Kolkata district.

According to the District Census Handbook Kolkata 2011, 141 wards of Kolkata Municipal Corporation formed Kolkata district. (3 wards were added later).

== Election highlights ==
The ward forms a city municipal corporation council electoral constituency and is a part of Behala Purba (Vidhan Sabha constituency).

Election year	Constituency	Name of councillor	Party affililiation
2005	Ward No. 122	Manju Kar	Communist Party of India (Marxist)
2010		Soma Chakraborty	All India Trinamool Congress
2015		Soma Chakraborty	All India Trinamool Congress
