= Pailan =

- Village
- Location in West Bengal Location in India
- Coordinates: 22.4293°N 88.3069°E
- Country: India
- State: West Bengal
- District: South 24 Parganas
- CD block: Bishnupur I
- Elevation: 9 m (30 ft)

Languages
  - Official: Bengali
  - Additional official: English
- Time zone: UTC+5:30 (IST)
- PIN: 700104
- Telephone code: +91 33
- Vehicle registration: WB-19 to WB-22, WB-95 to WB-99
- Lok Sabha constituency: Diamond Harbour
- Vidhan Sabha constituency: Bishnupur (SC)
- Website: www.s24pgs.gov.in

Pailan is a village and a gram panchayat of the Bishnupur I CD block in the Alipore Sadar subdivision of the South 24 Parganas district in the Indian state of West Bengal.

== Geography ==
Pailan is located at 22°25′45″N 88°18′25″E. It has an average elevation of 9 metres (30 ft).

== Transport ==
Pailan is on the National Highway 12.

Majerhat railway station is located nearby.

== Education ==
Pailan College of Management and Technology, established in 2003, offers diploma, undergraduate and postgraduate degree courses in Engineering and Technology and other allied fields.

Pailan World School is an English-medium coeducational institution established in 2005. It has facilities for teaching from class I to class XII.

== Healthcare ==
Chandi Doulatabad Block Primary Health Centre, with 10 beds, at Doulatabad (PO Nepalganj), is the major government medical facility in the Bishnupur I CD block.
