= Behala Purba Assembly constituency =

West Bengal Legislative Assembly constituency

Behala Purba
- Constituency No. 153 for the West Bengal Legislative Assembly
- Interactive Map Outlining Behala Purba Assembly Constituency

Constituency details
- Country: India
- Region: East India
- State: West Bengal
- District: Kolkata
- Lok Sabha constituency: Kolkata Dakshin
- Established: 1951
- Total electors: 308,157
- Reservation: None

Member of Legislative Assembly
- 18th West Bengal Legislative Assembly
- Incumbent Sankar Sikder
- Party: BJP
- Alliance: NDA
- Elected year: 2026

Behala Purba Assembly constituency (earlier known as Behala East Assembly constituency) is a Legislative Assembly constituency of Kolkata district in the Indian state of West Bengal.

== Overview ==
As per order of the Delimitation Commission in respect of the Delimitation of constituencies in the West Bengal, Behala Purba Assembly constituency is composed of the following:

- Ward Nos. 115, 116, 117, 120, 121, 122, 123, 124, 142, 143 and 144 of Kolkata Municipal Corporation.

Borough	Ward No.	Councillor	2021 Winner
XIII	115	Ratna Sur	Trinamool Congress
XIII	116	Krishna Singh	Trinamool Congress
XIII	117	Amit Singh	Trinamool Congress
XIII	120	Susanta Ghosh	Trinamool Congress
XIV	121	Rupak Ganguly	Trinamool Congress
XIII	122	Soma Chakraborty	Trinamool Congress
XVI	123	Sudip Polley	Trinamool Congress
XVI	124	Rajib Kumar Das	Trinamool Congress
XVI	142	Raghunath Patra	Trinamool Congress
XVI	143	Christina Biswas	Trinamool Congress
XVI	144	Shefali Pramanik	Trinamool Congress

Behala Purba Assembly constituency is part of No. 23 Kolkata Dakshin Lok Sabha constituency.

== Members of the Legislative Assembly ==
Year	Name	Party
Behala (Note: The two present - day Constituencies; Behala Purba and Behala Paschim was undivided and therefore had 1 MLA at a time.)
1952	Biren Roy	All India Forward Bloc (Ruikar)
1957	Rabindra Nath Mukhopadhyay	Communist Party of India
1962	Rabindra Nath Mukhopadhyay	Communist Party of India
Behala East (Note: The constituency was bifurcated into two constituencies. One was named Behala East (this one) and the other one was named Behala West. Since then two separate MLAs rule the two constituencies.)
1967	Niranjan Mukherjee	Communist Party of India (Marxist)
1969	Niranjan Mukherjee	Communist Party of India (Marxist)
1971	Niranjan Mukherjee	Communist Party of India (Marxist)
1972	Indrajit Majumdar	Indian National Congress
1977	Niranjan Mukherjee	Communist Party of India (Marxist)
1982	Niranjan Mukherjee	Communist Party of India (Marxist)
1987	Niranjan Mukherjee	Communist Party of India (Marxist)
1991	Kumkum Chakraborti	Communist Party of India (Marxist)
1996	Kumkum Chakraborti	Communist Party of India (Marxist)
2001	Parash Dutta	Trinamool Congress
2006	Kumkum Chakraborti	Communist Party of India (Marxist)
Major boundary changes; constituency renamed as Behala Purba (Note: The constituency was renamed as Behala Purba whereas the Behala West Assembly Constituency was renamed as Behala West.)

=== Behala Purba (since 2011) ===
#	Portrait	Name (born – died)	Tenure in office			Political Party	Election
#	Portrait	Name (born – died)	From	To	Time in office	Political Party	Election
1		Sovan Chaterjee	20 May 2011	8 May 2021	9 years, 353 days	Trinamool Congress	2011
1		Sovan Chaterjee	20 May 2011	8 May 2021	9 years, 353 days	Trinamool Congress	2016
2		Ratna Chaterjee	8 May 2021	7 May 2026 (Note: Contested the 2026 in Behala Paschim, but lost to Indranil Khan)	4 years, 364 days	Trinamool Congress	2021
3		Sankar Sikder (born 1979)	13 May 2026 (Note: Position was vacant from 7 May 2026 to 13 May 2026)	Incumbent	137 days	Bharatiya Janata Party	2026

== Election results ==
=== 2026 ===
In the 2026 elections, Sankar Sikder of the Bharatiya Janata Party defeated his nearest rival Subhasish Chakraborty of the TMC by 25,137 votes and by 10.72% of votes ending the 15- year rule of TMC in the constituency. The BJP gained 16.07% votes whereas the TMC lost 11.51% votes as compared to the 2021 elections. The CPI (M) lose -4.23% votes as compared to the 2021 elections by scoring just 9.37% of votes.

2026 West Bengal Legislative Assembly election: Behala Purba
Party	Candidate	Votes	%	±%
BJP	Sankar Sikder	115,502	49.22	+16.07
AITC	Subhasish Chakraborty	90,365	38.50	−11.51
CPI(M)	Dr Nilay Majumdar	21,991	9.37	−4.23
NOTA	None of the above	1,635	0.7	−0.58
Majority		25,137	10.72	−6.14
Turnout		234,687	90.31	+18.34
BJP gain from AITC		Swing		

=== 2021 ===
2021 West Bengal Legislative Assembly election: Behala Purba
Party	Candidate	Votes	%	±%
AITC	Ratna Chatterjee	110,968	50.01	
BJP	Payel Sarkar	73,540	33.15	
CPI(M)	Samita Har Chowdhury	30,172	13.6	
NOTA	None of the above	2,835	1.28	
Majority		37,428	16.86	
Turnout		221,872	71.97	
AITC hold		Swing		

=== 2016 ===
2016 West Bengal Legislative Assembly election: Behala Purba
Party	Candidate	Votes	%	±%
AITC	Sovan Chatterjee	96,621	47.33	
Independent	Ambikesh Mahapatra	72,327	35.43	
BJP	Chandra Bhan Singh	21,854	10.71	
SS	Sumit Banerjee	3,649	1.79	
None of the Above	None of the above	3,919	1.92	
Majority		24,294	11.90	
Turnout		2,05,294	73.83	
AITC hold		Swing		

=== 2011 ===
In 2011 Sovan Chatterjee of Trinamool Congress defeated his nearest rival Kumkum Chakraborty of CPI(M),

2011 West Bengal Legislative Assembly election: Behala Purba
Party	Candidate	Votes	%	±%
AITC	Sovan Chatterjee	1,16,709	60.28	+14.33
CPI(M)	Kumkum Chakraborty	68,536	35.40	−15.33
BJP	A. Biswajit Naidu	3,692	1.91	
BSP	Indrajit Kumar Halder	1,170	0.60	
IND	Tarun Kanti Das	1,131	0.58	
Majority		48,173	24.88	
Turnout		1,94,208	79.79	
AITC gain from CPI(M)		Swing	30.50#	

.# Swing calculated on Congress+Trinamool Congress vote percentages taken together in 2006.

=== 2006 ===
In the 2006 state assembly elections, Kumkum Chakraborti of Communist Party of India (Marxist) won the Behala East assembly seat defeating her nearest rival Sovan Chatterjee of Trinamool Congress. Contests in most years were multi cornered but only winners and runners are being mentioned. Parash Dutta of Trinamool Congress defeated Kumkum Chakraborti of CPI(M) in 2001. Kumkum Chakraborti of CPI(M) defeated Sonali Guha of Congress in 1996, and Sailen Dasgupta of Congress in 1991. Niranjan Mukherjeee of CPI(M) defeated Debashis Bhattacharya of Congress in 1987, Balaram Goswami of Congress in 1982, and Indrajit Mazumdar of Congress in 1977.

=== 1972 ===
Indrajit Majumdar of Congress won the Behala East seat in 1972. Niranjan Mukherjee of CPI(M) won in 1971, 1969 and 1967. Prior to that Behala was a single seat. Rabindra Nath Mukhopadhyay of CPI won the Behala seat in 1962 and 1957. In independent India's first election in 1952, Biren Roy of Forward Bloc (RG) won the Behala seat.
