= 2021 Kolkata Municipal Corporation election =

Election to Kolkata Municipal Corporation, 2021

- 19 December 2021

All 144 seats in Kolkata Municipal Corporation 73 seats needed for a majority
- Turnout: 64.64% (▼3.92%)

	First party	Second party	Third party
Party	AITC	BJP	INC
Last election	114 seats	7 seats	5 seats
Seats won	134	3	2
Seat change	▲20	▼4	▼3
Popular vote	1,887,442	241,053	107,763
Percentage	72.13%	9.21%	4.12%
	Fourth party	Fifth party	Sixth party
Party	CPI(M)	CPI	Independents
Alliance	LF	LF
Last election	10 seats	2 seats	3 seats
Seats won	1	1	3
Seat change	▼9	▼1	Steady
Popular vote	252,610	26,763	63,501
Percentage	9.65%	1.02%	2.43%
- Results by wards

- Structure after the election
Mayor before election
Firhad Hakim
AITC
Elected Mayor
Firhad Hakim
AITC

The 2021 Kolkata Municipal Corporation election was held on 19 December 2021 to elect 144 members of the Kolkata Municipal Corporation (KMC) which governs Kolkata, the capital of the Indian state of West Bengal. A total of 40,48,357 electors were eligible to vote in the election. The results were announced on 21 December.

The All India Trinamool Congress (AITC) won the election by an overwhelming majority and captured 134 out of 144 wards. Firhad Hakim was elected as the mayor of Kolkata. In this election, Bharatiya Janata Party (BJP) won 3 seats, Left Front won 2 seats (CPI and CPI(M) won 1 seat each), Indian National Congress (INC) won 2 seats and independent candidates won 3 seats.

== Schedule ==
Poll event	Schedule
Notification date	25 Nov 2021
Last Date for filing nomination	1 Dec 2021
Last Date for withdrawal of nomination	18 Dec 2021
Date of poll	19 Dec 2021
Date of counting of votes	21 Dec 2021

== Voter statistics ==
In this election, there were a total of 4,048,357 eligible electors. On 19 December 2,611,312 voters (64.50% of the total voters) exercised their franchise, of which 1,425,568 were male, 1,185,723 female and 21 registered voters were of the third gender.

== Parties and alliances ==
Following is a list of political parties and alliances which contested in this election:

Party	Symbol	Alliance	No. of contesting candidates
All India Trinamool Congress (AITC)		None	144
Bahujan Samaj Party (BSP)		None	6
Bharatiya Janata Party (BJP)		None	142
Indian National Congress (INC)		None	121
Nationalist Congress Party (NCP)		None	1
Communist Party of India (Marxist) (CPI(M))		Left Front	96
Communist Party of India (CPI)		Left Front	13
All India Forward Bloc (AIFB)		Left Front	11
Revolutionary Socialist Party (RSP)		Left Front	9
Independents (IND)		None	
Others (Note: SUCI(communist) contested 20 seats. CPI(ML)LIB and JD(U) fielded 3 candidates each. AB, BNARP and PDS fielded one candidate each.)		None	29

== Candidates ==
A total of 950 candidates contested in this election. Among them 402 candidates were women. A list of the candidates (ward-wise) of the four main parties/alliance(s) is presented below:

List of candidates
No.	Ward								
No.	Ward	AITC		Left Front		BJP		INC	
No.	Ward	Party	Candidate	Party	Candidate	Party	Candidate	Party	Candidate
Borough No. 1
1	Ward 1	AITC	Kartick Chandra Manna	CPI(M)	Pallab Mukherjee	BJP	Ashish Kumar Trivedi	INC	Safikul Khadim
2	Ward 2	AITC	Kakali Sen	CPI(M)	Debolina Sarkar	BJP	Rajendra Shaw	INC	Rathindra Nath Paul
3	Ward 3	AITC	Debika Chakraborty	CPI(M)	Namita Das	BJP	Anima Singh	INC	Suchitra Bose
4	Ward 4	AITC	Goutam Halder	CPI(M)	Kanai Lal Podder	BJP	Sabyasachi Chakraborty	INC	Biresh Chakraborty
5	Ward 5	AITC	Tarun Saha	CPI(M)	Ramesh Pandey	BJP	Shreeram Yadav	INC	Ram Kumar Jha
6	Ward 6	AITC	Suman Singh	CPI	Sagina Begum	BJP	Pramila Singh	INC	Priti Shaw
7	Ward 7	AITC	Bapi Ghosh	CPI(M)	Mahan Tapas Kundu	BJP	Brajesh Jha	INC	Moloy Mukherjee
8	Ward 8	AITC	Pooja Panja	CPI(M)	Madhab Bose	BJP	Manoj Kumar	INC	Tapan Seal
9	Ward 9	AITC	Mitali Saha	CPI(M)	Dipika Bhattacharya	BJP	Rubi Banerjee	INC	Pinki Shaw
Borough No.2
10	Ward 10	AITC	Subrata Banerjee	CPI	Karuna Sengupta	BJP	Ishwar Dayal Shaw	INC	Pratap Sen
11	Ward 11	AITC	Atin Ghosh	AIFB	Prodyot Nath	BJP	Manas Sen Chowdhury	INC	Sumanta Sen
12	Ward 12	AITC	Minakshi Gangopadhyay	CPI	Pubali Deb	BJP	Tanusree Roy	INC	Anima Ghosh
Borough No. 3
13	Ward 13	AITC	Anindya Kishore Routh	CPI(M)	Birati Dutta	BJP	Kunal Bhattacharya	INC	Tarun Kanti Seal
14	Ward 14	AITC	Amal Chakraborty	RSP	Swapan Ghosh	BJP	Debraj Saha	INC	Palash Kumari Saha
Borough No. 2
15	Ward 15	AITC	Sukhla Bhore	RSP	Dipa Saha	BJP	Anita Das	INC	Ruma Halder
16	Ward 16	AITC	Swapan Kumar Das	CPI(M)	Sujit Deb	BJP	Sharad Kumar Singh	INC	Rabi Saha
17	Ward 17	AITC	Mohan Kumar Gupta	CPI(M)	Moti Lal Ghosh	BJP	Paramita Banerjee	INC	Moumita Kali
18	Ward 18	AITC	Sunanda Sarkar	CPI(M)	Srabani Chakraborty	BJP	Anuradha Singh	INC	Amrita Roy
19	Ward 19	AITC	Shikha Saha	CPI(M)	Ruma Bhattacharya	BJP	Debashish Seal	INC	Chandra Sekhar Roy
20	Ward 20	AITC	Vijay Upadhyay	CPI(M)	Ajit Chowdhury	BJP	Indra Jhawar	INC	Raghbendra Chaturvedi
Borough No. 4
21	Ward 21	AITC	Mira Hazra	CPI(M)	Sujata Saha	BJP	Purnima Chakraborty	INC supports CPI(M)	
22	Ward 22	AITC	Shyam Prokash Purohit	Left Front supports INC		BJP	Meena Devi Purohit	INC	Nagesh Singh
23	Ward 23	AITC	Sanwarmal Agarwal	CPI(M)	Dhirendra Pandey	BJP	Vijay Ojha	INC	Uttam Sonkar
24	Ward 24	AITC	Ellora Saha	AIFB	Manju Mohta	BJP	Kamini Tiwari	INC	Sapna Gupta
25	Ward 25	AITC	Rajesh Kumar Sinha	AIFB	Naresh Prasad Poddar	BJP	Sunil Harsh	INC	Bikram Singh
26	Ward 26	AITC	Tarak Nath Chattopadhyay	CPI(M)	Tapas Pramanik	BJP	Shashi Gond	INC	Amar Singh
27	Ward 27	AITC	Minakshi Gupta	CPI	Papiya Ganguly	BJP	Manju Jaiswal	INC	Tanmaya Mukherjee
28	Ward 28	AITC	Ayan Chakraborty	CPI(M)	Ejaz Ahmed	BJP	Amiya Hazra	INC	Shahina Javed
Borough No. 3
29	Ward 29	AITC	Iqbal Ahmed	AIFB	Mohammed Shahid	BJP	Mohammed Mukhtar	INC	Prakash Upadhyay
30	Ward 30	AITC	Papiya Ghosh Biswas	CPI(M)	Saswati Dasgupta	BJP	Manjindar Kaur	INC supports CPI(M)	
31	Ward 31	AITC	Paresh Paul	CPI(M)	Tarun Basu (Note: Members of RCPI contested under the symbol of CPI(M) in Ward no. 31 and 87.)	BJP	Sree Narayan Chowdhury	INC	Chand Basu Ansari
32	Ward 32	AITC	Shanti Ranjan Kundu	CPI(M)	Joydeep Bhattacharya	BJP	Rubi Sanyal	INC supports CPI(M)	
33	Ward 33	AITC	Chinu Biswas	CPI(M)	Manisha Biswas	BJP	Rita Debnath	INC supports CPI(M)	
34	Ward 34	AITC	Alokananda Das	AIFB	Namita Bose	BJP	Malti Panja	INC supports CPI(M)	
35	Ward 35	AITC	Ashutosh Das	CPI(M)	Samir Chakraborty	BJP	Girish Kumar Shukla	INC	Mohammed Wais
Borough No. 5
36	Ward 36	AITC	Sachin Kumar SIngh	CPI	Mousumi Ghosh	BJP	Ravi Kant Singh	INC	Nandan Ghosh
37	Ward 37	AITC	Soma Chaudhuri	CPI(M)	Mithu Das	BJP	Sheikh Mousumi	INC	Afrin Begum
Borough No. 4
38	Ward 38	AITC	Bose Sadhana	CPI(M)	Prosanta Dey	BJP	Ramesh Thakur Jaiswal	INC	Punam Chowdhury
39	Ward 39	AITC	Mohammed Jasimuddin	AIFB	Subhankar Rai	BJP	Mohammed Jahangir	INC	Ali Hussain
Borough No. 5
40	Ward 40	AITC	Suparna Dutta	RSP	Kaberi Bhattacharjee	BJP	Shefali Sharma	INC	Asha Mahanti
41	Ward 41	AITC	Reita Chowdhury	CPI(M)	Nehal Ahamed Qaisar	BJP	Rajeev Kumar Sinha	INC	Jwala Pratap Singh
42	Ward 42	AITC	Mahesh Kumar Sharma	CPI	Pradip Kumar Singh	BJP	Sunita Jhawar	INC supports CPI(M)	
43	Ward 43	AITC	Shagupta Parveen	Left Front supports INC		BJP	Chanda Kharwar	INC	Shahnaaz Parveen
44	Ward 44	AITC	Rehana Khatoon	CPI(M)	Shahid Quasimuddin	BJP	Mukesh Kumar Singh	INC	Mohammed Zaid Anwar
45	Ward 45	AITC	Shakti Pratap Singh	Left Front supports INC		BJP	Kushal Pandey	INC	Santosh Kumar Pathak
Borough No. 6
46	Ward 46	AITC	Priyanka Saha	CPI(M)	Anusha Akbar	BJP	Pinky Sonkar	INC	Wahida Khatoon
47	Ward 47	AITC	Bimal Singh	Left Front supports INC		BJP	Chitra Paul	INC	Mohammed Ali
Borough No. 5
48	Ward 48	AITC	Biswarup Dey	CPI(M)	Anwasha Das	BJP	Chittaranjan Manna	INC	Ashish Chatterjee
49	Ward 49	AITC	Monalisa Banerjee	CPI(M)	Upaneeta Pandey	BJP	Rajlakshmi Biswas	INC	Aamna Khanam
50	Ward 50	AITC	Mousumi Dey	Left Front supports INC		BJP	Sajal Ghosh	INC	Manash Sarkar
Borough No. 6
51	Ward 51	AITC	Indranil Kumar	RSP	Sunetra Ojha	BJP	Sanjib Gunin	INC	Ravindra Singh
52	Ward 52	AITC	Sohini Mukherjee	AIFB	Rukhsana Begum	BJP	Kamini Samtani	INC	Aparna Saha
53	Ward 53	AITC	Indrani Saha Banerjee	Left Front supports INC		BJP	Gautam Dasgupta	INC	Akbar Hossain
54	Ward 54	AITC	Amiruddin	CPI(M)	Jahangir Mondal	BJP	Debashish Dutta	INC	Yusuf Abdul Waheed
55	Ward 55	AITC	Sabita Rani Das	CPI(M)	Chaitali Bhowmick Nair	BJP	Amrita Ghosh	INC	Dorothy Dewan
Borough No. 7
56	Ward 56	AITC	Swapan Samaddar	CPI(M)	Jayasri Debnandy	BJP	Tapan Samanta	INC	Samir Alam
57	Ward 57	AITC	Jiban Saha	CPI(M)	Dilip Poddar	BJP	Milan Dere	INC	Afroz Alam
58	Ward 58	AITC	Sandipan Saha	Left Front supports INC		BJP	Chandan Das	INC	Sadananda Show
59	Ward 59	AITC	Jolly Bose	CPI(M)	Rama Kar Basu	BJP	Aishi Majhi	INC	Fatema Anjum
Borough No. 6
60	Ward 60	AITC	Kaiser Jamil	CPI(M)	Manzar Ahsan	BJP	Ramesh Kumar Singh	INC	Nadim Mohammed
61	Ward 61	AITC	Manzar Iqbal	Left Front supports INC		BJP	Harinarayan Tiwari	INC	Sajid Ismail
62	Ward 62	AITC	Sana Ahmed	Left Front supports INC		BJP	Sahina Khatoon	INC	Tarannum Jahan
Borough No. 7
63	Ward 63	AITC	Susmita Bhattacharya Chatterjee	CPI(M)	Mohammed Seraj Khan	BJP	Naveen Kumar Mishra	INC	Francis Ganpat
64	Ward 64	AITC	Shammi Jahan Begum	CPI	Mohammed Azam Jawed	BJP	Dipankar Saha	INC	Hossain Zahid
65	Ward 65	AITC	Nibedita Sharma	RSP	Anulekha Sinha	BJP	Kaberi Sengupta Mohanty	INC	Anisha Akhter
66	Ward 66	AITC	Ahmed Faiz Khan	CPI(M)	Shaquib Akhtar	BJP	Abhishek Sen	INC	Sayed Mohammed Ahsan
67	Ward 67	AITC	Bijan Lal Mukherjee	CPI(M)	Dipu Das	BJP	Sandip Banerjee	INC supports CPI(M)	
Borough No. 7
68	Ward 68	AITC	Sudarshana Mukherjee	CPI(M)	Dorothy Majumder Ghoshal	BJP	Pinky Ghosh	INC	Moumita Mukherjee
69	Ward 69	AITC	Dilip Bose	CPI(M)	Gopal Hazra	BJP	Kaushal Prasad Mishra	INC	Biswajit Ghosh
70	Ward 70	AITC	Ashim Kumar Bose	CPI(M)	Barun Das	BJP	Bhim Singh Verma	INC	Devasuvra Majumder
Borough No. 9
71	Ward 71	AITC	Papiya Singh	CPI(M)	Keka Mitra	BJP	Pratima Ghosh	INC	Supriya Das
Borough No. 7
72	Ward 72	AITC	Sandip Ranjan Bakshi	CPI(M)	Prokash Bhattacharya	BJP	Ruma Nandan	INC	Prasenjit Sen
Borough No. 9
73	Ward 73	AITC	Kajari Banerjee	CPI(M)	Madhumita Das	BJP	Indrajit Khatick	INC	Prabir Kumar Paul
74	Ward 74	AITC	Debalina Biswas	AIFB	Dipa Chakraborty	BJP	Paramita Dutta	INC supports AIFB	
75	Ward 75	AITC	Nezamuddin Shams	CPI(M)	Faiyaz Ahmed Khan	BJP	Mahesh Ram	INC	Mohammed Akil
76	Ward 76	AITC	Sasti Das	CPI(M)	Shakil Akhter	BJP	Sajal Kar	INC	Soumen Pal
77	Ward 77	AITC	Shamima Rehan Khan	AIFB	Sajda Parveen	BJP	Gopa Banerjee	INC	Sayyada Banoo
78	Ward 78	AITC	Soma Das	AIFB	Jyoti Das	BJP	Bina Kanojia	INC	Gunja Mallick
79	Ward 79	AITC	Ram Pyare Ram	MFB	Shyamal Kanti Mitra	BJP	Jitendra Trivedi	INC	Aquib Gulzar
80	Ward 80	AITC	Mohammed Anwar Khan	Left Front supports INC		BJP	Ershad Ahmed Sain	INC	Surendra Kumar Singh
Borough No. 10
81	Ward 81	AITC	Jui Biswas	CPI(M)	Rinku Dey	BJP	Ditaya Kar	INC	Anindita Paul
Borough No. 9
82	Ward 82	AITC	Firhad Hakim	CPI	Paramita Dasgupta	BJP	Pratap Sonkar	INC supports CPI	
Borough No. 8
83	Ward 83	AITC	Probir Mukhopadhyay	CPI(M)	Arka Ranjan Bhattacharya	BJP	Gouranga Sarkar	INC	Rajib Paul
84	Ward 84	AITC	Paromita Chatterjee	CPI(M)	Bithika Nath	BJP	Tamasha Chatterjee	INC	Ruma Mukherjee
85	Ward 85	AITC	Debasish Kumar	CPI(M)	Gobinda Naskar	BJP	Ruby Mukherjee	INC	Joydeb Bhowmick
86	Ward 86	AITC	Saurav Basu	Left Front supports INC		BJP	Rajarshi Lahiri	INC	Dwarka Kumar Ghosh
87	Ward 87	AITC	Manisha Bose	CPI(M)	Dyutisree Dass Som	BJP	Anushree Chattopadhyay	INC	Koli Narayan Mukherjee
88	Ward 88	AITC	Mala Roy	CPI(M)	Kartick Mondal	BJP	Samir Sil	INC supports CPI(M)	
Borough No. 10
89	Ward 89	AITC	Mamata Majumder	CPI	Salil Chaudhury	BJP	Shantanu Bhattacharya	INC	Kartik Das
Borough No. 8
90	Ward 90	AITC	Chaitali Chattopadhyay	CPI	Promita Roy Chowdhury	BJP	Mousumi Bhattacharya	INC	Aditi Chatterjee
Borough No. 10
91	Ward 91	AITC	Baiswanor Chatterjee	CPI(M)	Surajit Sen Gupta	BJP	Dilip Kumar Mitra	INC	Samir Saha
92	Ward 92	AITC	Abhishek Mukherjee	CPI	Madhucchanda Deb	BJP	Suman Das	INC	Manash Kumar Bhadra
93	Ward 93	AITC	Mousumi Das	CPI(M)	Gopa Roychowdhury	BJP	Sumita Dasgupta	INC	Sampa Ghosh
94	Ward 94	AITC	Sandip Nandi Majumder	RSP	Bula Rani Seal	BJP	Pradipta Arjun	INC	Rahul Naskar
95	Ward 95	AITC	Tapan Dasgupta	CPI(M)	Anwesha Bhowmick	BJP	Rajib Saha	INC	Santanu Guhathakurta
96	Ward 96	AITC	Vasundhara Goswami	CPI(M)	Dipali Goswami	BJP	Sandipa Singha Roy	INC	Sanchaita Sinha Roy
97	Ward 97	AITC	Debabrata Majumdar	CPI(M)	Susanta Pal	BJP	Soma Ghosh Dutta	INC	Prahlad Chakraborty
98	Ward 98	AITC	Arup Chakraborty	CPI(M)	Mrintunjoy Chakraborty	BJP	Chandan Kumar Saha	INC	Swapan Bose
99	Ward 99	AITC	Mitali Banerjee	RSP	Shikha Mukherjee	BJP	Taniya Das	INC	Mun Mun Das
100	Ward 100	AITC	Prosenjit Das	CPI(M)	Mira Ghosh	BJP	Sanjay Das	INC	Sahajan Dewan
Borough No. 12
101	Ward 101	AITC	Bappaditya Dasgupta	CPI(M)	Atanu Chatterjee	BJP	Santosh Mitra	INC	Amar Bhattacharjee
102	Ward 102	AITC	Sima Ghosh	CPI(M)	Bhaswati Gangopadhyay	BJP	Indra Gangopadhyay	INC	Tapasi Karmakar
Borough No. 11
103	Ward 103	AITC	Sukumar Das	CPI(M)	Nandita Roy	BJP	Sandip Bagchi	INC	Debajyoti Das
104	Ward 104	AITC	Tarakeswar Chakaraborty	RSP	Dhiraj Gangopadhyay	BJP	Swarupa Mukherjee	INC	Prodip Mitra
Borough No. 12
105	Ward 105	AITC	Sushila Dutta	CPI(M)	Namita Dutta	BJP	Tamali Roy	INC	Shrabanti Bhattacharjee
106	Ward 106	AITC	Arjit Das Thakur	CPI(M)	Dipankar Mondal	BJP	Pavan Baidya	INC	Biswanath Biswas
106	Ward 106	AITC	Arjit Das Thakur	RSP	Aloke Chatterjee	BJP	Pavan Baidya	INC	Biswanath Biswas
107	Ward 107	AITC	Lipika Manna	CPI(M)	Goutam Roy	BJP	Somnath Das	INC supports CPI(M)	
108	Ward 108	AITC	Sushanta Kumar Ghosh	CPI(M)	Tapan Malik	BJP	Megnath Halder	INC	Sanjoy Majumder
109	Ward 109	AITC	Ananya Banerjee	CPI(M)	Shikha Pujari	BJP	Beauty Roy Halder	INC supports CPI(M)	
Borough No. 11
110	Ward 110	AITC	Swaraj Kumar Mondal	CPI(M)	Tanushree Mondal	BJP	Nitai Mondal	INC supports CPI(M)	
111	Ward 111	AITC	Sandip Das	CPI(M)	Chayan Bhattacharya	BJP	Parijat Chanda	INC supports CPI(M)	
112	Ward 112	AITC	Gopal Roy	AIFB	Subrata Kumar Dey	BJP	Debajyoti Mazumder	INC	Narayan Biswas
113	Ward 113	AITC	Anita Kar Majumder Sil	CPI(M)	Ajanta Das	BJP	Rubi Das	INC supports CPI(M)	
114	Ward 114	AITC	Biswajit Mandal	CPI(M)	Mohit Bhattacharya	BJP	Partha Pal	INC	Subhas Chandra Bose
Borough No. 13
115	Ward 115	AITC	Ratna Sur	CPI(M)	Subhankar Bagchi	BJP	Tapas Dhara	INC	Gurudas Pal
116	Ward 116	AITC	Krishna Singh	CPI(M)	Chitra Patit	BJP	Swapna banerjee	INC	Sharmistha Saha
117	Ward 117	AITC	Amit Singh	CPI(M)	Sanjay Khan	BJP	Kalyani Dasgupta	INC	Sanjit Dey
118	Ward 118	AITC	Tarak Singh	CPI(M)	Sujoy Adhikary	BJP	Dipankar Banik	INC supports CPI(M)	
119	Ward 119	AITC	Kakali Bag	Left Front supports INC		BJP	Rakhi Chatterjee	INC	Deepa Badge
120	Ward 120	AITC	Susanta Ghosh	CPI(M)	Gautam Adhikary	BJP	Ujjwal Baral	INC	Biswajit Das
Borough No. 14
121	Ward 121	AITC	Rupak Ganguly	CPI(M)	Ashish Mondal	BJP	Chandra Bhan Singh	INC	Kaustav Bhattacharjee
Borough No. 13
122	Ward 122	AITC	Soma Chakraborty	CPI(M)	Manju Kar	BJP	Sangita Nath Dey	INC	Manasi Das Naskar
Borough No. 16
123	Ward 123	AITC	Sudip Polley	CPI(M)	Prosenjit Ghosh	BJP	Sharmistha Bhattacharjee	INC supports CPI(M)	
124	Ward 124	AITC	Rajib Kumar Das	CPI(M)	Arijit Sinha	BJP	Shankar Sikder	INC	Prabir Sarkar
125	Ward 125	AITC	Chhanda Sarkar	CPI(M)	Priya Roy	BJP	Dalia Chakroborty	INC	Kajal Biswas
126	Ward 126	AITC	Ghanashree Bagh	CPI	Biman Guhathakurta	BJP	Pradip Ray	INC	Subhasish Kar
Borough No. 14
127	Ward 127	AITC	Malobika Baidya	CPI(M)	Rina Bhakta	BJP	Mallika Biswas	INC supports CPI(M)	
128	Ward 128	AITC	Partha Sarkar	CPI(M)	Ratna Roy Majumder	BJP	Shirsendu Banerjee	INC	Gitika Mridha
129	Ward 129	AITC	Sanhita Das	CPI(M)	Mousumi Chatterjee	BJP	Nabanita Bhattacharjee	INC	Dolan Das
130	Ward 130	AITC	Avijit Mukherjee	CPI(M)	Partha Sarathi Sarkar	BJP	Subhasis Kar	INC	Gosto Behari Jana
131	Ward 131	AITC	Ratna Chatterjee	CPI(M)	Ranjan Dasgupta	BJP	Rabin Roy	INC	Subir Mondal
132	Ward 132	AITC	Sanchita Mitra	CPI(M)	Mita Ghosh	BJP	Sutapa Gupta	INC	Piya Roy
Borough No. 15
133	Ward 133	AITC	Ranjit Shil	CPI(M)	Jayabrata Bera	Withdrew Nomination		INC	Mohammad Salim
134	Ward 134	AITC	Shams Iqbal	No Candidate		Withdrew Nomination		No Candidate	
135	Ward 135	AITC	Akhtari Nijami	Left Front supports INC		BJP	Archana Gupta	INC	Shamshad Begum
136	Ward 136	AITC	Shamsuzzaman Ansari	CPI(M)	Subhasish Poddar	BJP	Anil Kumar Verma	INC supports CPI(M)	
137	Ward 137	AITC	Rehmat Alam Anssari	Left Front supports INC		BJP	Rakesh Verma	INC	Wasim Ansari
138	Ward 138	AITC	Farida Parvin	CPI(M)	Farhanaj Begum	BJP	Minu Das	INC	Mamtaj Begum
139	Ward 139	AITC	Sheikh Mushtaque Ahamed	CPI(M)	Abu Kayes Mohammed	BJP	Mahejabeen Khatoon	INC supports CPI(M)	
140	Ward 140	AITC	Abu Mohammed Tarik	CPI(M)	Sheikh Mohammed Zamir	BJP	Salauddin	INC	Abdul Ali Jahangir
141	Ward 141	AITC	Sibnath Gayen	CPI	Sampad Roy	BJP	Tapas Dhali	INC	Abhishek Baidya
Borough No. 16
142	Ward 142	AITC	Ragunath Patra	LF supported IND Goutam Kolay		BJP	Amar Das	INC supported Left Front	
143	Ward 143	AITC	Christina Biswas	CPI(M)	Phulu Mondal	BJP	Gargi Viswanathan	INC	Lata Saha
144	Ward 144	AITC	Shefali Pramanik	CPI(M)	Biplab Banerjee	BJP	Anindita Ghosh	INC supports CPI(M)	

== Results ==
=== Results by Parties ===
134	3	2	1	1	3
AITC	BJP	INC	CPI(M)	CPI	IND

Vote share by alliance
1. AITC (72.1%)
2. LF (11.9%)
3. BJP (9.21%)
4. INC (4.12%)
5. IND (2.43%)
6. Others (0.22%)
Vote share by Party
1. AITC (72.1%)
2. CPI(M) (9.65%)
3. BJP (9.21%)
4. INC (4.12%)
5. CPI (1.02%)
6. RSP (0.78%)
7. AIFB (0.44%)
8. BSP (0.06%)
9. IND (2.43%)
10. Others (0.16%)
Seat share by alliance
1. AITC (93.1%)
2. BJP (2.08%)
3. LF (1.39%)
4. INC (1.39%)
5. Others (2.08%)

Alliance	Party	Seats					Votes				Ref(s)
Alliance	Party	Contested	Won		Change	Second Position	Votes	%		Change (%)	Ref(s)
Alliance	Party	Contested	Party wise	Alliance wise	Change	Second Position	Votes	Party wise	Alliance wise	Change (%)	Ref(s)
None	AITC	144	134		▲20	10	18,87,442	72.13		▲21.47	
None	BJP	142	3		▼4	48	2,41,053	9.21		▼6.76	
Left Front	CPI(M)	128	1	2	▼9	65	2,52,610	9.65	11.89	▼13.90	
Left Front	CPI	128	1	2	▼1	65	26,763	1.02	11.89	▼13.90	
Left Front	RSP	128	0	2	▼2	65	20,385	0.78	11.89	▼13.90	
Left Front	AIFB	128	0	2	▼1	65	11,447	0.44	11.89	▼13.90	
None	INC	121	2		▼3	16	1,07,763	4.12		▼2.47	
None	BSP	6	0		Steady	0	1,558	0.06			
None	NCP	1	0		Steady	0	3	0.00			
None	Independents		3		Steady	5	63,501	2.43		▲0.64	
None	Others	26	0		Steady	0	4,261	0.16			
Total Polled Votes / Voter Turnout							26,16,786	64.64			
Registered Voters							40,48,357	100.00			

=== Results by Wards ===
The Ward-wise Results were announced by the West Bengal State Election Commission after the counting.

Results
		Winner			Runner Up			Margin
Borough	Ward number	Party	Candidate	Votes	Party	Candidate	Votes	Margin
I	Ward 1	AITC	Kartick Chandra Manna	24,421	BJP	Ashish Kumar Trivedi	2,752	21,669
I	Ward 2	AITC	Kakali Sen	27,503	CPI(M)	Debolina Sarkar	3,168	24,335
I	Ward 3	AITC	Debika Chakraborty	25,431	CPI(M)	Namita Das	3,417	22,014
I	Ward 4	AITC	Goutam Haldar	21,003	CPI(M)	Kanai Lal Podder	2,945	18,058
I	Ward 5	AITC	Tarun Saha	11,107	CPI(M)	Ramesh Pandey	1,033	10,074
I	Ward 6	AITC	Suman Singh	16,890	BJP	Pramila Singh	4,142	12,748
I	Ward 7	AITC	Bapi Ghosh	6,840	BJP	Brajesh Jha	1,681	5,159
I	Ward 8	AITC	Pooja Panja	7,332	CPI(M)	Madhab Bose	1,241	6,091
I	Ward 9	AITC	Mitali Saha	6,261	CPI(M)	Dipika Bhattacharya	1,235	5,026
II	Ward 10	AITC	Subrata Banerjee	6,786	CPI	Karuna Sengupta	4,109	2,677
II	Ward 11	AITC	Atin Ghosh	11,313	BJP	Manas Sen Chowdhury	887	10,426
II	Ward 12	AITC	Dr. Minakshi Gangopadhyay	7,306	BJP	Tanusree Roy	1,859	5,447
II	Ward 15	AITC	Sukhla Bhore	8,879	BJP	Anita Das	1,408	7,471
II	Ward 16	AITC	Swapan Kumar Das	7,922	BJP	Sharad Kumar Singh	1,114	6,808
II	Ward 17	AITC	Mohan Kumar Gupta (Mona)	11,097	CPI(M)	Moti Lal Ghosh	832	10,265
II	Ward 18	AITC	Sunanda Sarkar	11,870	CPI(M)	Srabani Chakraborty	726	11,144
II	Ward 19	AITC	Sikha Saha	8,792	CPI(M)	Ruma Bhattacharya	1,055	7,737
II	Ward 20	AITC	Vijay Upadhyay	10,239	CPI(M)	Ajit Kumar Choudhury	722	9,517
III	Ward 13	AITC	Anindya Kishor Routh	18,665	CPI(M)	Birati Dutta	1,323	17,342
III	Ward 14	AITC	Amal Chakraborty (Bhola)	23,080	RSP	Swapan Ghosh	3,651	19,429
III	Ward 29	AITC	Iqbal Ahmed	16,127	INC	Prakash Kumar Upadhyay	11,461	4,666
III	Ward 30	AITC	Papiya Ghosh (Biswas)	11,315	CPI(M)	Saswati Dasgupta	1,853	9,462
III	Ward 31	AITC	Paresh Paul	22,619	BJP	Sree Narayan Chowdhury	2,110	20,509
III	Ward 32	AITC	Santi Ranjan Kundu	26,198	CPI(M)	Joydeep Bhattacharya	1,652	24,546
III	Ward 33	AITC	Chinu Biswas	22,701	CPI(M)	Manisha Biswas	2,219	20,482
III	Ward 34	AITC	Alokananda Das	18,290	AIFB	Namita Bose	1,045	17,245
III	Ward 35	AITC	Ashutosh Das	20,897	CPI(M)	Samir Chakraborty	953	19,944
IV	Ward 21	AITC	Mira Hazra	3,851	CPI(M)	Sujata Saha	3,804	47
IV	Ward 22	BJP	Meena Devi Purohit	3,800	AITC	Shyam Prokash Purohit	2,277	1,523
IV	Ward 23	BJP	Vijay Ojha	4,356	AITC	Sanwarmal Agarwal	1,143	3,213
IV	Ward 24	AITC	Ellora Saha	5,006	BJP	Kamini Tiwari	2,590	2,416
IV	Ward 25	AITC	Rajesh Kumar Sinha	6,966	BJP	Sunil Harsh	2,849	4,117
IV	Ward 26	AITC	Tarak Nath Chattopadhyay	8,320	CPI(M)	Tapas Pramanik	2,267	6,053
IV	Ward 27	AITC	Minakshi Gupta	8,745	BJP	Manju Jaiswal	1,657	7,088
IV	Ward 28	AITC	Ayan Chakraborty	13,157	INC	Shahina Javed	3,323	9,834
IV	Ward 38	AITC	Sadhana Bose	10,173	CPI(M)	Prosanta Dey (Gopal)	1,863	8,310
IV	Ward 39	AITC	Mohammad Jasimuddin	5,333	AIFB	Ali Hussain	3,808	1,525
V	Ward 36	AITC	Sachin Kumar Singh	12,536	INC	Nandan Ghosh	1,561	10,975
V	Ward 37	AITC	Soma Chaudhuri	10,495	CPI(M)	Mithu Das	1,224	9,271
V	Ward 40	AITC	Suparna Dutta	6,221	BJP	Sefali Sharma	928	5,293
V	Ward 41	AITC	Reita Chowdhury	3,118	BJP	Rajeev Kumar Sinha	2,006	1,112
V	Ward 42	AITC	Mahesh Kumar Sharma	3,353	BJP	Sunita Jhawar	2,625	728
V	Ward 43	IND	Ayesha Kaniz	4,822	AITC	Shagufta Parveen	2,711	2,111
V	Ward 44	AITC	Rehana Khatoon	7,351	INC	Mohammed Zaid Anwar	3,029	4,322
V	Ward 45	INC	Santosh Kumar Pathak	4,813	AITC	Shakti Pratap Singh	1,936	2,877
V	Ward 48	AITC	Biswarup Dey	7,564	BJP	Chittaranjan Manna	814	6,750
V	Ward 49	AITC	Monalisa Banerjee	5,032	CPI(M)	Upaneeta Pandey	503	4,529
V	Ward 50	BJP	Sajal Ghosh	4,552	AITC	Mousumi Dey	3,499	1,053
VI	Ward 46	AITC	Priyanka Saha	6,225	BJP	Pinky Sonkar	949	5,276
VI	Ward 47	AITC	Bimal Singh	5,053	BJP	Chitra Paul (Bosamia)	1,938	3,115
VI	Ward 51	AITC	Indranil Kumar	3,721	INC	Ravindra Singh	1,840	1,881
VI	Ward 52	AITC	Sohini Mukherjee	6,693	BJP	Kamini Samtani	2,315	4,378
VI	Ward 53	AITC	Indrani Saha Banerjee	8,384	BJP	Gautam Dasgupta	2,675	5,709
VI	Ward 54	AITC	Amiruddin	27,111	CPI(M)	Jahangir Mondal	1,109	26,002
VI	Ward 55	AITC	Sabita Rani Das	13,562	BJP	Amrita Ghosh	2,347	11,215
VI	Ward 60	AITC	Kaiser Jamil	19,206	INC	Nadim Md.	8,226	10,980
VI	Ward 61	AITC	Manzar Iqbal	19,739	INC	Sajid Ismail	962	18,777
VI	Ward 62	AITC	Sana Ahmed	20,254	INC	Tarannum Jahan	3,335	16,919
VII	Ward 56	AITC	Swapan Samaddar	18,828	INC	Samir Alam	3,341	15,487
VII	Ward 57	AITC	Jiban Saha	30,024	BJP	Milan Dere	1,186	28,838
VII	Ward 58	AITC	Sandipan Saha	46,697	BJP	Chandan Das	5,874	40,823
VII	Ward 59	AITC	Jolly Bose	34,216	INC	Fatema Anjum	2,829	31,387
VII	Ward 63	AITC	Susmita Bhattacharya Chatterjee	5,962	BJP	Naveen Kumar Mishra	2,219	3,743
VII	Ward 64	AITC	Shammi Jahan Begum	19,015	INC	Hossain Zahid	730	18,285
VII	Ward 65	AITC	Nibedita Sharma	28,428	RSP	Anulekha Sinha	5,758	22,670
VII	Ward 66	AITC	Ahmed Faiz Khan	66,138	CPI(M)	Shaquib Akhtar	4,093	62,045
VII	Ward 67	AITC	Bijan Lal Mukherjee	20,353	CPI(M)	Dipu Das	10,063	10,290
VIII	Ward 68	AITC	Sudarshana Mukherjee	4,337	IND	Tanima Chatterjee	2,505	1,832
VIII	Ward 69	AITC	Dilip Bose	13,127	BJP	Kaushal Prasad Mishra	3,314	9,813
VIII	Ward 70	AITC	Ashim Kumar Bose (Babai)	6,164	BJP	Bhim Singh Verma	2,136	4,028
VIII	Ward 72	AITC	Sandip Ranjan Bakshi	4,683	IND	Satchidananda Banerjee	2,948	1,735
VIII	Ward 83	AITC	Probir Kumar Mukhopadhyay	8,725	CPI(M)	Arka Ranjan Bhattacharya	1,373	7,352
VIII	Ward 84	AITC	Paromita Chatterjee	5,421	BJP	Tamasha Chatterjee	2,142	3,279
VIII	Ward 85	AITC	Debasish Kumar (Deba)	11,416	BJP	Ruby Mukherjee	1,452	9,964
VIII	Ward 86	AITC	Saurav Basu (Bappa)	5,383	IND	Gaurav Biswas	1,500	3,883
VIII	Ward 87	AITC	Manisha Bose	3,017	BJP	Anusree Chattopadhyay	1,196	1,821
VIII	Ward 88	AITC	Mala Roy	9,461	CPI(M)	Kartick Mondal	2,104	7,357
VIII	Ward 90	AITC	Chaitali Chattopadhyay	6,796	BJP	Mowsumy Bhattacharya	1,195	5,601
IX	Ward 71	AITC	Papiya Singh	10,815	BJP	Pratima Ghosh	1,954	8,861
IX	Ward 73	AITC	Kajari Banerjee	9,067	BJP	Indrajit Khatick	2,574	6,493
IX	Ward 74	AITC	Debalina Biswas	10,359	BJP	Paramita Dutta	2,978	7,381
IX	Ward 75	AITC	Nezamuddin Shams	10,442	CPI(M)	Faiyaz Ahmad Khan	3,503	6,939
IX	Ward 76	AITC	Sasti Das	7,544	INC	Soumen Paul	1,744	5,800
IX	Ward 77	AITC	Shamima Rehan Khan	18,666	AIFB	Sajda Parveen	2,589	16,077
IX	Ward 78	AITC	Soma Das	23,322	BJP	Bina Kanojia	2,571	20,751
IX	Ward 79	AITC	Ram Pyare Ram	11,641	BJP	Jitendra Trivedi	4,513	7,128
IX	Ward 80	AITC	Mohammad Anwar Khan	9,336	BJP	Ershad Ahmed Sain	3,512	5,824
IX	Ward 82	AITC	Firhad Hakim	17,609	BJP	Pratap Sonkar	2,693	14,916
X	Ward 81	AITC	Jui Biswas	18,029	INC	Anindita Paul (Taniya Paul)	2,795	15,234
X	Ward 89	AITC	Mamata Majumdar	7,029	CPI	Dr. Salil Chaudhury	2,441	4,588
X	Ward 91	AITC	Baiswanor Chatterjee	13,444	CPI(M)	Surajit Sen Gupta (Kunal)	6,151	7,293
X	Ward 92	CPI	Madhuchhanda Deb	10,250	AITC	Abhishek Mukherjee	6,828	3,422
X	Ward 93	AITC	Mousumi Das	14,782	BJP	Sumita Dasgupta	3,550	11,232
X	Ward 94	AITC	Sandip Nandi Majumdar	10,562	RSP	Bula Rani Seal	1,550	9,012
X	Ward 95	AITC	Tapan Dasgupta	12,104	CPI(M)	Anwesha Bhowmick	3,528	8,576
X	Ward 96	AITC	Vasundhara Goswami	10,526	CPI(M)	Dipali Goswami (Doli)	4,639	5,887
X	Ward 97	AITC	Debabrata Majumdar	12,937	CPI(M)	Susanta Pal	2,979	9,958
X	Ward 98	AITC	Arup Chakraborty	8,734	CPI(M)	Mritunjoy Chakraborty (Pradip)	8,440	294
X	Ward 99	AITC	Mitali Banerjee	9,387	RSP	Shikha Mukherjee	4,927	4,460
X	Ward 100	AITC	Prosenjit Das	12,413	CPI(M)	Mira Ghosh	4,053	8,360
XI	Ward 103	CPI(M)	Nandita Roy	5,862	AITC	Sukumar Das	5,770	92
XI	Ward 104	AITC	Tarakeswar Chakraborty	13,053	RSP	Dhiraj Kumar Gangopadhyay	2,111	0,942
XI	Ward 110	AITC	Swaraj Kumar Mondal	10,833	CPI(M)	Tanushree Mondal	3,065	7,768
XI	Ward 111	AITC	Sandip Das	10,182	CPI(M)	Chayan Bhattacharya	9,601	581
XI	Ward 112	AITC	Gopal Roy	14,776	BJP	Dr. Debojyoti Mazumder	2,662	12,114
XI	Ward 113	AITC	Anita Kar Majumdar Sil	16,918	CPI(M)	Ajanta Das	3,001	13,917
XI	Ward 114	AITC	Biswajit Mandal	16,721	CPI(M)	Mohit Kumar Bhattacharya	5,971	10,750
XII	Ward 101	AITC	Bappaditya Dasgupta	23,407	CPI(M)	Atanu Chatterjee	3,968	19,439
XII	Ward 102	AITC	Sima Ghosh (Jaya)	9,825	CPI(M)	Bhaswati Gangopadhyay	3,718	6,107
XII	Ward 105	AITC	Sushila Mondal	9,791	CPI(M)	Namita Dutta	2,345	7,446
XII	Ward 106	AITC	Arijit Das Thakur (Rana)	14,877	CPI(M)	Dipankar Mondal	4,734	10,143
XII	Ward 107	AITC	Lipika Manna	16,092	CPI(M)	Goutam Roy	5,064	11,028
XII	Ward 108	AITC	Sushanta Kumar Ghosh	21,693	BJP	Meghnath Halder	5,087	16,606
XII	Ward 109	AITC	Ananya Banerjee	40,458	CPI(M)	Shikha Pujari	2,835	37,623
XIII	Ward 115	AITC	Ratna Sur	10,809	IND	Rajat Sekhar	3,409	7,400
XIII	Ward 116	AITC	Krishna Singh	11,561	BJP	Swapna Banerjee	3,526	8,035
XIII	Ward 117	AITC	Amit Singh	9,329	BJP	Kalyani Dasgupta	1,898	7,431
XIII	Ward 118	AITC	Tarak Singh	10,275	BJP	Dipankar Banik	2,116	8,159
XIII	Ward 119	AITC	Kakali Bag	6,679	BJP	Rakhi Chatterjee	1,825	4,854
XIII	Ward 120	AITC	Susanta Ghosh (Bua)	7,670	CPI(M)	Gautam Adhikary (Bubun)	1,723	5,947
XIII	Ward 122	AITC	Soma Chakraborty	18,566	CPI(M)	Manju Kar	7,268	11,298
XIV	Ward 121	AITC	Rupak Ganguly	10,484	CPI(M)	Ashis Mondal (Valtu)	4,720	5,764
XIV	Ward 127	AITC	Malobika Baidya	14,096	CPI(M)	Rina Bhakta	13,182	914
XIV	Ward 128	AITC	Partha Sarkar	10,117	CPI(M)	Ratna Roy Majumder	9,098	1,019
XIV	Ward 129	AITC	Sanhita Das	15,970	CPI(M)	Mousumi Chatterjee	7,193	8,777
XIV	Ward 130	AITC	Avijit Mukherjee	9,253	CPI(M)	Partha Sarathi Sarkar	2,037	7,216
XIV	Ward 131	AITC	Ratna Chatterjee	13,207	CPI(M)	Ranjan Dasgupta	3,000	10,207
XIV	Ward 132	AITC	Sanchita Mitra	9,085	CPI(M)	Mita Ghosh	2,835	6,250
XV	Ward 133	AITC	Ranajit Shil	12,108	INC	Mohammad Salim	1,136	10,972
XV	Ward 134	AITC	Shams Iqbal	24,708	IND	Qaisar Khan	418	24,290
XV	Ward 135	IND	Rubina Naaz	10,025	AITC	Akhtari Nijami	9,665	360
XV	Ward 136	AITC	Shamsuzzaman Ansari	10,761	BJP	Anil Kumar Verma	1,054	9,707
XV	Ward 137	INC	Wasim Ansari	6,670	AITC	Rehmat Alam Anssari	5,296	1,374
XV	Ward 138	AITC	Farida Parvin	15,619	INC	Mamtaj Begam	2,698	12,921
XV	Ward 139	AITC	Sheikh Mushtaque Ahamed	23,890	CPI(M)	Abu Kayes Molla	3,338	20,552
XV	Ward 140	AITC	Abu Mohammed Tarik	11,186	INC	Abdul Ali Jahangir	3,987	7,199
XV	Ward 141	IND	Purbasa Naskar	11,844	AITC	Sibnath Gayen	11,335	509
XVI	Ward 123	AITC	Sudip Polley (Nani)	13,461	CPI(M)	Prosenjit Ghosh	4,891	8,570
XVI	Ward 124	AITC	Rajib Kumar Das	13,887	BJP	Sankar Sikder	4,653	9,234
XVI	Ward 125	AITC	Chhanda Sarkar	20,993	CPI(M)	Priya Roy	4,474	16,519
XVI	Ward 126	AITC	Ghanasree Bagh	14,160	CPI	Biman Guha Thakurta	3,560	10,600
XVI	Ward 142	AITC	Raghunath Patra	15,959	BJP	Amar Das	961	14,998
XVI	Ward 143	AITC	Christina Biswas	14,317	BJP	Gargee Viswanathan	2,465	11,852
XVI	Ward 144	AITC	Shefali Pramanik	5,214	CPI(M)	Biplab Banerjee	1,461	3,753

== See also ==
- Kolkata Municipal Corporation
- 2016 West Bengal Legislative Assembly election
- 2018 West Bengal Panchayat elections
- 2019 Indian general election in West Bengal
- 2021 West Bengal Legislative Assembly election
- 2024 Indian general election in West Bengal
- 2021 elections in India
