= Ward No. 86, Kolkata Municipal Corporation =

Ward No. 86
- Kolkata Municipal Corporation
- Interactive Map Outlining Ward No. 86
- Location in Kolkata
- Coordinates (dms): 22.518917°N 88.364306°E
- Country: India
- State: West Bengal
- City: Kolkata
- Neighbourhoods: Ballygunge (Lake Terrace-Keyatala, Hindustan Park)
- Reservation: Open
- Parliamentary constituency: Kolkata Dakshin
- Assembly constituency: Rashbehari
- Borough: 8

Population (2011)
  - Total: 19,195
- Time zone: UTC+5:30 (IST)
- PIN: 700 029
- Area code: +91 33

Ward No. 86, Kolkata Municipal Corporation is an administrative division of Kolkata Municipal Corporation in Borough No. 8, covering parts of Ballygunge (Lake Terrace-Keyatala) and Gariahat (Hindustan Park) neighbourhoods in South Kolkata, in the Indian state of West Bengal.

== History ==
Attempts were made to establish a municipal corporation at Kolkata from the middle of the 19th century. The electoral system was introduced for the first time in 1847, and 4 of the 7 board members were elected by the rate payers. In 1852 the board was replaced by a new one and in 1863 a new body was formed. As per old records, in 1872 there were 25 wards in Kolkata (spellings as in use at that time) – 1. Shyampukur, 2. Kumartuli, 3. Bartala, 4. Sukea Street, 5. Jorabagan, 6. Jorasanko, 7. Barabazar, 8. Kolutola, 9. Muchipara, 10. Boubazar, 11. Padmapukur, 12. Waterloo Street, 13. Fenwick Bazar, 14. Taltala, 15. Kalinga, 16. Park Street, 17. Victoria Terrace, 18. Hastings, 19. Entali, 20. Beniapukur, 21. Baliganj-Tollyganj, 22. Bhabanipur, 23. Alipur, 24.Ekbalpur and 25. Watganj. A new municipal corporation was created in 1876, wherein 48 commissioners were elected and 24 were appointed by the government. With the implementation of the Municipal Consolidation Act of 1888 the area under the jurisdiction of the municipal corporation was enlarged. Certain areas were already there but more parts of them were added (current spellings) - Entally, Manicktala, Beliaghata, Ultadanga, Chitpur, Cossipore, Beniapukur, Ballygunge, Watganj and Ekbalpur, and Garden Reach and Tollygunj. The Calcutta Municipal Act of 1923 brought about important changes. It liberalised the constitution along democratic lines.

The state government superseded the Corporation in 1948 and the Calcutta Municipal Act of 1951 came into force. Adult franchise was introduced in municipal elections in 1962. With the addition of certain areas in the southern parts of the city, the number of wards increased from 75 to 144.

== Geography ==
Ward No. 86 is bordered on the north by Hazra Road; on the east by Leela Roy Sarani and Gariahat Road; on the south by Dr. Meghnad Saha Sarani (Southern Avenue); and on the west by Garcha 1st Lane, Dover Terrace connecting Garcha 1st Lane, Dover Lane, Ramani Chatterjee Road and Lake West Road.

Location of Ward No. 86 in Kolkata Ward Map

The ward is served by Lake and Gariahat police stations of Kolkata Police.

Karaya Women police station, has jurisdiction over all police districts under the jurisdiction of the South East Division, i.e. Topsia, Beniapukur, Ballygunge, Gariahat, Lake, Karaya, Rabindra Sarobar and Tiljala.

== Demographics ==
As per the 2011 Census of India, Ward No. 86, Kolkata Municipal Corporation, had a total population of 19,195, of which 9,724 (51%) were males and 9,471 (49%) were females. Population below 6 years was 1,051. The total number of literates in Ward No. 86 was 16,259 (89.61% of the population over 6 years).

Kolkata is the second most literate district in West Bengal. The literacy rate of Kolkata district has increased from 53.0% in 1951 to 86.3% in the 2011 census.

See also – List of West Bengal districts ranked by literacy rate

Literacy in KMC wards

North Kolkata
Ward No. 1 – 86.12%
Ward No. 2 – 94.24%
Ward No. 3 – 86.74%
Ward No. 4 – 89.27%
Ward No. 5 – 90.32%
Ward No. 6 – 81.12%
Ward No. 7 – 87.65%
Ward No. 8 – 93.57%
Ward No. 9 – 91.60%
Ward No. 10 – 92.38%
Ward No. 11 – 87.96%
Ward No. 12 – 84.95%
Ward No. 13 – 83.39%
Ward No. 14 – 87.87%
Ward No. 15 – 88.89%
Ward No. 16 – 88.62%
Ward No. 17 – 92.30%
Ward No. 18 – 78.72%
Ward No. 19 – 89.29%
Ward No. 20 – 85.93%
Ward No. 21 – 78.12%
Ward No. 22 – 85.07%
Ward No. 23 – 71.14%
Ward No. 24 – 73.16%
Ward No. 25 – 85.49%
Ward No. 26 – 82.34%
Ward No. 27 – 88.19%
Ward No. 28 – 79.39%
Ward No. 29 – 70.69%
Ward No. 30 – 88.71%
Ward No. 31 – 88.28%
Ward No. 32 – 75.73%
Ward No. 33 – 91.17%
Central Kolkata
Ward No. 34 – 92.79%
Ward No. 35 – 91.44%
Ward No. 36 – 66.34%
Ward No. 37 – 79.12%
Ward No. 38 – 85.77%
Ward No. 39 – 73.27%
Ward No. 40 – 88.14%
Ward No. 41 – 83.53%
Ward No. 42 – 75.02%
Ward No. 43 – 79.52%
Ward No. 44 – 79.09%
Ward No. 45 – 74.69%
Ward No. 46 – 85.38%
Ward No. 47 – 87.87%
Ward No. 48 – 82.04%
Ward No. 49 – 65.51%
Ward No. 50 – 88.70%
Ward No. 51 – 93.01%
Ward No. 52 – 86.18%
Ward No. 53 – 89.49%
Ward No. 54 – 82.10%
Ward No. 55 – 84.84%
Ward No. 56 – 85.53%
Ward No. 57 – 80.20%
Ward No. 58 – 74.35%
Ward No. 59 – 80.39%
Ward No. 60 – 74.04%
Ward No. 61 – 80.54%
Ward No. 62 – 86.04%
Ward No. 63 – 84.39%
Ward No. 64 – 85.21%
Ward No. 65 – 81.60%
South Kolkata
Ward No. 66 – 80.95%
Ward No. 67 – 89.52%
Ward No. 68 – 90.86%
Ward No. 69 – 86.07%
Ward No. 70 – 94.20%
Ward No. 71 – 92.01%
Ward No. 72 – 90.06%
Ward No. 73 – 89.28%
Ward No. 74 – 84.56%
Ward No. 75 – 80.27%
Ward No. 76 – 88.40%
Ward No. 77 – 83.84%
Ward No. 78 – 83.00%
Ward No. 79 – 81.96%
Ward No. 80 – 71.89%
Ward No. 81 – 85.14%
Ward No. 82 – 84.82%
Ward No. 83 – 85.63%
Ward No. 84 – 85.71%
Ward No. 85 – 88.19%
Ward No. 86 – 89.61%
Ward No. 87 – 90.26%
Ward No. 88 – 85.09%
Ward No. 89 – 92.40%
Ward No. 90 – 84.60%
Ward No. 91 – 90.57%
Ward No. 92 – 93.53%
Ward No. 93 – 91.30%
Ward No. 94 – 89.11%
Ward No. 95 – 95.61%
Ward No. 96 – 96.57%
Ward No. 97 – 94.60%
Ward No. 98 – 96.24%
Ward No. 99 – 95.79%
Ward No. 100 – 95.98%
Ward No. 101 – 95.36%
Ward No. 102 – 93.53%
Ward No. 103 – 94.77%
Ward No. 104 – 96.03%
Ward No. 105 – 93.86%
Ward No. 106 – 92.97%
Ward No. 107 – 90.06%
Ward No. 108 – 80.74%
Ward No. 109 – 85.49%
Ward No. 110 – 91.35%
Ward No. 111 – 93.36%
Ward No. 112 – 92.50%
Ward No. 113 – 92.18%
Ward No. 114 – 91.13%
Ward No. 115 – 95.53%
Ward No. 116 – 86.91%
Ward No. 117 – 86.53%
Ward No. 118 – 90.04%
Ward No. 119 – 94.04%
Ward No. 120 – 92.15%
Ward No. 121 – 91.86%
Ward No. 122 – 92.88%
Ward No. 123 – 93.42%
Ward No. 124 – 92.55%
Ward No. 125 – 92.50%
Ward No. 126 – 93.78%
Ward No. 127 – 91.82%
Ward No. 128 – 92.67%
Ward No. 129 – 92.56%
Ward No. 130 – 95.55%
Ward No. 131 – 93.48%
Ward No. 132 – 90.30%
Ward No. 133 – 83.48%
Ward No. 134 – 73.75%
Ward No. 135 – 75.75%
Ward No. 136 – 85.01%
Ward No. 137 – 79.16%
Ward No. 138 – 78.67%
Ward No. 139 – 77.56%
Ward No. 140 – 79.93%
Ward No. 141 – 75.15%
Note: The regional distribution
is a broad one and
there is some overlapping
2011 Census: Ward-Wise

Primary Census Abstract Data

Census data about mother tongue and religion is not available at the ward level. For district level information see Kolkata district.

According to the District Census Handbook Kolkata 2011, 141 wards of Kolkata Municipal Corporation formed Kolkata district. (3 wards were added later).

== List of councillors ==
It forms a city municipal corporation council electoral constituency and is a part of Rashbehari Assembly constituency.

Election	Councillor	Party
2005	Dipti Mukherjee	Trinamool Congress
2010	Durga Prasad Mukherjee	Trinamool Congress
2015	Tishta Biswas Das	Bharatiya Janata Party
2021	Saurav Basu	Trinamool Congress

== Election results ==
=== 2021 ===
2021 Kolkata Municipal Corporation election: Ward No. 86
Party	Candidate	Votes	%	±%
TMC	Saurav Basu	5,383	67.15	
Independent	Gaurav Biswas	1,500	18.71	
BJP	Rajarshi Lahiri	973	12.14	
INC	Dwarka Kumar Ghosh	160	1.99	
Majority		3,883	48.44	
Turnout		8,016		
TMC gain from BJP		Swing		
