= Ward No. 87, Kolkata Municipal Corporation =

Ward No. 87
- Kolkata Municipal Corporation
- Interactive Map Outlining Ward No. 87
- Location in Kolkata
- Coordinates (dms): 22.513917°N 88.350694°E
- Country: India
- State: West Bengal
- City: Kolkata
- Neighbourhood: Kalighat (Lake Market-Lake Range-Mudiali)
- Reservation: Women(Open)
- Parliamentary constituency: Kolkata Dakshin
- Assembly constituency: Rashbehari
- Borough: 8

Population (2011)
  - Total: 12,675
- Time zone: UTC+5:30 (IST)
- PIN: 700 029
- Area code: +91 33

Ward No. 87, Kolkata Municipal Corporation is an administrative division of Kolkata Municipal Corporation in Borough No. 8, covering parts of Kalighat (Lake Market-Lake Range-Mudiali) neighbourhood in South Kolkata, in the Indian state of West Bengal.

== History ==
The establishment and evolution of Kolkata Municipal Corporation followed a long process starting from around the middle of the 19th century. The Municipal Consolidation Act of 1888 and certain steps taken thereafter saw the addition of peripheral areas in the eastern and southern parts of the city to the corporation area. In 1888, there were 75 commissioners, 50 of whom were elected, 15 appointed by the government and 10 nominated from bodies like Chambers of Commerce, Trades Associations and the Port Commissioners. The Calcutta Municipal Act of 1923 brought about important changes. The adjacent municipalities of Cossipore, Chitpore, Manicktola and Garden Reach were amalgamated with Kolkata. Garden Reach was later taken out.

Post-independence developments saw the introduction of adult franchise in municipal elections in 1962. The number of wards increased from 75 to 100. Tollygunge was merged with Kolkata in 1953. The Calcutta Municipal Corporation Act 1980, which came into effect in 1984, extended the boundaries of Kolkata by including South Suburban, Garden Reach and Jadavpur municipalities in Kolkata. With the addition of Joka to Kolkata, the number of wards rose to 144.

== Geography ==
Ward No. 87 is bordered on the north by Rashbehari Avenue; on the east by Barouj Road; on the south by the Budge Budge branch of Eastern Railway; and on the west by Shyama Prasad Mukherjee Road.

Location of Ward No. 87 in Kolkata Ward Map

The ward is served by Tollygunge police station of Kolkata Police.

Tollygunge Women's police station has jurisdiction over all the police districts in the South Division, i.e. Park Street, Shakespeare Sarani, Alipore, Hastings, Maidan, Bhowanipore, Kalighat, Tollygunge, Charu Market, New Alipur and Chetla.

== Demographics ==
As per the 2011 Census of India, Ward No. 87, Kolkata Municipal Corporation, had a total population of 12,675, of which 6,285 (50%) were males and 6,390 (50%) were females. Population below 6 years was 544. The total number of literates in Ward No. 87 was 10,950 (90.26% of the population over 6 years).

Kolkata is the second most literate district in West Bengal. The literacy rate of Kolkata district has increased from 53.0% in 1951 to 86.3% in the 2011 census.

See also – List of West Bengal districts ranked by literacy rate

Literacy in KMC wards

North Kolkata
Ward No. 1 – 86.12%
Ward No. 2 – 94.24%
Ward No. 3 – 86.74%
Ward No. 4 – 89.27%
Ward No. 5 – 90.32%
Ward No. 6 – 81.12%
Ward No. 7 – 87.65%
Ward No. 8 – 93.57%
Ward No. 9 – 91.60%
Ward No. 10 – 92.38%
Ward No. 11 – 87.96%
Ward No. 12 – 84.95%
Ward No. 13 – 83.39%
Ward No. 14 – 87.87%
Ward No. 15 – 88.89%
Ward No. 16 – 88.62%
Ward No. 17 – 92.30%
Ward No. 18 – 78.72%
Ward No. 19 – 89.29%
Ward No. 20 – 85.93%
Ward No. 21 – 78.12%
Ward No. 22 – 85.07%
Ward No. 23 – 71.14%
Ward No. 24 – 73.16%
Ward No. 25 – 85.49%
Ward No. 26 – 82.34%
Ward No. 27 – 88.19%
Ward No. 28 – 79.39%
Ward No. 29 – 70.69%
Ward No. 30 – 88.71%
Ward No. 31 – 88.28%
Ward No. 32 – 75.73%
Ward No. 33 – 91.17%
Central Kolkata
Ward No. 34 – 92.79%
Ward No. 35 – 91.44%
Ward No. 36 – 66.34%
Ward No. 37 – 79.12%
Ward No. 38 – 85.77%
Ward No. 39 – 73.27%
Ward No. 40 – 88.14%
Ward No. 41 – 83.53%
Ward No. 42 – 75.02%
Ward No. 43 – 79.52%
Ward No. 44 – 79.09%
Ward No. 45 – 74.69%
Ward No. 46 – 85.38%
Ward No. 47 – 87.87%
Ward No. 48 – 82.04%
Ward No. 49 – 65.51%
Ward No. 50 – 88.70%
Ward No. 51 – 93.01%
Ward No. 52 – 86.18%
Ward No. 53 – 89.49%
Ward No. 54 – 82.10%
Ward No. 55 – 84.84%
Ward No. 56 – 85.53%
Ward No. 57 – 80.20%
Ward No. 58 – 74.35%
Ward No. 59 – 80.39%
Ward No. 60 – 74.04%
Ward No. 61 – 80.54%
Ward No. 62 – 86.04%
Ward No. 63 – 84.39%
Ward No. 64 – 85.21%
Ward No. 65 – 81.60%
South Kolkata
Ward No. 66 – 80.95%
Ward No. 67 – 89.52%
Ward No. 68 – 90.86%
Ward No. 69 – 86.07%
Ward No. 70 – 94.20%
Ward No. 71 – 92.01%
Ward No. 72 – 90.06%
Ward No. 73 – 89.28%
Ward No. 74 – 84.56%
Ward No. 75 – 80.27%
Ward No. 76 – 88.40%
Ward No. 77 – 83.84%
Ward No. 78 – 83.00%
Ward No. 79 – 81.96%
Ward No. 80 – 71.89%
Ward No. 81 – 85.14%
Ward No. 82 – 84.82%
Ward No. 83 – 85.63%
Ward No. 84 – 85.71%
Ward No. 85 – 88.19%
Ward No. 86 – 89.61%
Ward No. 87 – 90.26%
Ward No. 88 – 85.09%
Ward No. 89 – 92.40%
Ward No. 90 – 84.60%
Ward No. 91 – 90.57%
Ward No. 92 – 93.53%
Ward No. 93 – 91.30%
Ward No. 94 – 89.11%
Ward No. 95 – 95.61%
Ward No. 96 – 96.57%
Ward No. 97 – 94.60%
Ward No. 98 – 96.24%
Ward No. 99 – 95.79%
Ward No. 100 – 95.98%
Ward No. 101 – 95.36%
Ward No. 102 – 93.53%
Ward No. 103 – 94.77%
Ward No. 104 – 96.03%
Ward No. 105 – 93.86%
Ward No. 106 – 92.97%
Ward No. 107 – 90.06%
Ward No. 108 – 80.74%
Ward No. 109 – 85.49%
Ward No. 110 – 91.35%
Ward No. 111 – 93.36%
Ward No. 112 – 92.50%
Ward No. 113 – 92.18%
Ward No. 114 – 91.13%
Ward No. 115 – 95.53%
Ward No. 116 – 86.91%
Ward No. 117 – 86.53%
Ward No. 118 – 90.04%
Ward No. 119 – 94.04%
Ward No. 120 – 92.15%
Ward No. 121 – 91.86%
Ward No. 122 – 92.88%
Ward No. 123 – 93.42%
Ward No. 124 – 92.55%
Ward No. 125 – 92.50%
Ward No. 126 – 93.78%
Ward No. 127 – 91.82%
Ward No. 128 – 92.67%
Ward No. 129 – 92.56%
Ward No. 130 – 95.55%
Ward No. 131 – 93.48%
Ward No. 132 – 90.30%
Ward No. 133 – 83.48%
Ward No. 134 – 73.75%
Ward No. 135 – 75.75%
Ward No. 136 – 85.01%
Ward No. 137 – 79.16%
Ward No. 138 – 78.67%
Ward No. 139 – 77.56%
Ward No. 140 – 79.93%
Ward No. 141 – 75.15%
Note: The regional distribution
is a broad one and
there is some overlapping
2011 Census: Ward-Wise

Primary Census Abstract Data

Census data about mother tongue and religion is not available at the ward level. For district level information see Kolkata district.

According to the District Census Handbook Kolkata 2011, 141 wards of Kolkata Municipal Corporation formed Kolkata district. (3 wards were added later).

== List of councillors ==
The ward forms a city municipal corporation council electoral constituency and is a part of Rashbehari Assembly constituency.

Election	Councillor	Party
2005	Subrata Mukherjee	Nationalist Congress Party
2010	Tanima Chatterjee	Trinamool Congress
2015	Subrata Ghosh	Bharatiya Janata Party
2021	Manisha Bose	Trinamool Congress

== Election results ==
=== 2021 ===
2021 Kolkata Municipal Corporation election: Ward No. 87
Party	Candidate	Votes	%	±%
TMC	Manisha Bose	3,017	64.96	
BJP	Anushree Chattopadhyay	1,196	25.75	
CPI(M)	Dyutisree Das Som	311	6.69	
INC	Koli Narayan Mukherjee	85	1.83	
Independent	Mithu Ghosh Dastidar	35	0.75	
Majority		1,821	39.21	
Turnout		4,644		
TMC gain from BJP		Swing		
