= Metiaburuz Assembly constituency =

Constituency of the West Bengal Legislative Assembly, in India

Metiaburuz
- Constituency No. 157 for the West Bengal Legislative Assembly
- Interactive Map Outlining Metiaburuz Assembly Constituency

Constituency details
- Country: India
- Region: East India
- State: West Bengal
- District: South 24 Parganas
- Lok Sabha constituency: Diamond Harbour
- Established: 2011
- Total electors: 256,252
- Reservation: None

Member of Legislative Assembly
- 18th West Bengal Legislative Assembly
- Incumbent Abdul Khaleque Molla
- Party: DTC
- Elected year: 2026

Metiaburuz Assembly constituency is a Legislative Assembly constituency of South 24 Parganas district in the Indian state of West Bengal.

== Overview ==
As per the order of the Delimitation Commission in respect of the Delimitation of constituencies in West Bengal, Metiaburuz Assembly constituency is composed of the following:

- Ward Nos. 136, 137, 138, 139, 140 and 141 of Kolkata Municipal Corporation.

Borough	Ward No.	Councillor	2021 Winner
XV	136	Shamsuzzaman Ansari	Trinamool Congress
XV	137	Wasim Ansari	Trinamool Congress
XV	138	Farida Parvin	Trinamool Congress
XV	139	Sheikh Mushtaque Ahamed	Trinamool Congress
XV	140	Abu Mohammed Tariq	Trinamool Congress
XV	141	Purbasa Naskar	Trinamool Congress

- Ward Nos. 1, 2, 3, 4, 5, 6, 7, 9 and 10 of Maheshtala Municipality.

Metiaburuz Assembly constituency is part of No. 21 Diamond Harbour (Lok Sabha constituency).

== Members of the Legislative Assembly ==
Year	Name	Party
2011	Mumtaz Begum	Trinamool Congress
2016	Abdul Khaleque Molla	Trinamool Congress
2021	Abdul Khaleque Molla	Trinamool Congress
2026	Abdul Khaleque Molla	Trinamool Congress

== Election results ==
=== 2026 ===
2026 West Bengal Legislative Assembly election: Metiaburuz
Party	Candidate	Votes	%	±%
AITC	Abdul Khaleque Molla	124,230	68.99	▼7.86
BJP	Bir Bahadur Singh	36,351	20.19	▲4.19
CPI(M)	Monirul Islam	9,567	5.31	▼33.23
INC	Mohammad Mukhtar	6,441	3.58	New entry
NOTA	None of the above	1,685	0.94	▼0.59
Majority		87,879	48.8	▼12.05
Turnout		180,068	94.99	▲18.29
AITC hold		Swing		

=== 2021 ===
2021 West Bengal Legislative Assembly election: Metiaburuz
Party	Candidate	Votes	%	±%
AITC	Abdul Khaleque Molla	151,066	76.85	
BJP	Ramjit Prasad	31,462	16.0	
Indian Secular Front	Nuruzzaman Molla	7,389	3.76	
NOTA	None of the above	3,008	1.53	
Majority		119,604	60.85	
Turnout		196,582	76.7	
AITC hold		Swing		

=== 2016 ===
2016 West Bengal Legislative Assembly election: Metiaburuz
Party	Candidate	Votes	%	±%
AITC	Abdul Khaleque Molla	79,749	49.75	
CPI(M)	Monirul Islam	61,773	38.54	
BJP	Sanjay Singh	13,259	8.27	
NOTA	None of the above	2,755	1.72	
IND	Ahammad Ali Molla	1,110	0.69	
IUML	Abdul Rahim	939	0.59	
RLD	Bedar Bakht	703	0.44	
Majority		17,976	11.21	
Turnout		1,60,288	71.66	
AITC hold		Swing		

=== 2011 ===
2011 West Bengal Legislative Assembly election: Metiaburuz
Party	Candidate	Votes	%	±%
AITC	Mumtaz Begum	55,003	41.56	
CPI(M)	Badruddoza Molla	48,409	36.58	
IND	Abdul Khaleque Molla (Note: Abdul Khaleque Molla, contesting as an independent, was a rebel Congress candidate.)	24,143	18.24	
BJP	Md. Sajjad	3,140	2.37	
IUML	Nisar Ahmed	1,658	1.25	
Majority		6,594	4.98	
Turnout		1,32,353	72.62	
AITC win (new seat)				
