= Abdul Khaleque Molla =

Indian politician

Member of the West Bengal Legislative Assembly
- Incumbent
- Assumed office 2016
- Preceded by: Mumtaz Begum
- Constituency: Metiaburuz
- In office 2006–2011
- Preceded by: Mohammed Amin
- Succeeded by: Firhad Hakim
- Constituency: Garden Reach

Personal details
- Born: 2 March 1945 (age 81)
- Party: Trinamool Congress (2016–present) (until 2026); Democratic Trinamool Congress (from 2026)
- Other political affiliations: Indian National Congress (until 2016)

Abdul Khaleque Molla is an Indian politician belonging to Democratic Trinamool Congress. He is elected as MLA of Metiaburuz Vidhan Sabha constituency in West Bengal Legislative Assembly since 2016. He was the MLA of Garden Reach Vidhan Sabha constituency from 2006 to 2011 representing Indian National Congress.
