= Mumtaz Begum (Indian politician) =

Indian politician

MLA of Metiaburuz Vidhan Sabha Constituency
- In office 2011–2016
- Preceded by: Constituency established
- Succeeded by: Abdul Khaleque Molla

Personal details
- Party: All India Trinamool Congress

Mumtaz Begum is an Indian politician affiliated with All India Trinamool Congress. She was elected as MLA of Metiaburuz Vidhan Sabha constituency in 2011 in West Bengal Legislative Assembly.
