= Ward No. 22, Kolkata Municipal Corporation =

Ward No. 22
- Kolkata Municipal Corporation
- Interactive Map Outlining Ward No. 22
- Location in Kolkata
- Coordinates: 22.586861°N 88.351667°E
- Country: India
- State: West Bengal
- City: Kolkata
- Neighbourhood covered: Posta
- Reservation: Open
- Parliamentary constituency: Kolkata Uttar
- Assembly constituency: Jorasanko
- Borough: 4

Government
  - Type: Mayor-Council
  - Body: KMC
  - Councillor: Meena Devi Purohit
  - Party: BJP

Population (2011)
  - Total: 15,730
- Time zone: UTC+5:30 (IST)
- PIN: 700 007
- Area code: +91 33

Ward No. 22, Kolkata Municipal Corporation is an administrative division of Kolkata Municipal Corporation in Borough No. 4, covering parts of Posta neighbourhood in North Kolkata, in the Indian state of West Bengal.

== History ==
Attempts were made to establish a municipal corporation at Kolkata from the middle of the 19th century. The electoral system was introduced for the first time in 1847, and 4 of the 7 board members were elected by the rate payers. In 1852 the board was replaced by a new one and in 1863 a new body was formed. As per old records, in 1872 there were 25 wards in Kolkata (spellings as in use at that time) – 1. Shyampukur, 2. Kumartuli, 3. Bartala, 4. Sukea Street, 5. Jorabagan, 6. Jorasanko, 7. Barabazar, 8. Kolutola, 9. Muchipara, 10. Boubazar, 11. Padmapukur, 12. Waterloo Street, 13. Fenwick Bazar, 14. Taltala, 15. Kalinga, 16. Park Street, 17. Victoria Terrace, 18. Hastings, 19. Entali, 20. Beniapukur, 21. Baliganj-Tollyganj, 22. Bhabanipur, 23. Alipur, 24.Ekbalpur and 25. Watganj. A new municipal corporation was created in 1876, wherein 48 commissioners were elected and 24 were appointed by the government. With the implementation of the Municipal Consolidation Act of 1888 the area under the jurisdiction of the municipal corporation was enlarged. Certain areas were already there but more parts of them were added (current spellings) - Entally, Manicktala, Beliaghata, Ultadanga, Chitpur, Cossipore, Beniapukur, Ballygunge, Watganj and Ekbalpur, and Garden Reach and Tollygunj. The Calcutta Municipal Act of 1923 brought about important changes. It liberalised the constitution along democratic lines.

The state government superseded the Corporation in 1948 and the Calcutta Municipal Act of 1951 came into force. Adult franchise was introduced in municipal elections in 1962. With the addition of certain areas in the southern parts of the city, the number of wards increased from 75 to 144.

== Geography ==
Ward No. 22 is bordered on the north by the Port Trust’s road leading from the Hooghly River bank to Kalikrishna Tagore Street and Darpa Narayan Tagore Street; on the east by Jadulal Mallick Road, Jogndra Kaviraj Row, Kalakar Street and Jag Mohan Mullick Street; on the south by the Port Trust’s road leading from Mahatma Gandhi Road and Cotton Street to the Hooghly River Bank; and on the west by the Hooghly River and Maharshi Devendra Road.

Location of Ward No. 22 in Kolkata Ward Map

The ward is served by Posta police station of Kolkata Police.

Taltala Women police station covers all police districts under the jurisdiction of the Central division of Kolkata Police, i.e. Bowbazar, Burrabazar, Girish Park, Hare Street, Jorasanko, Muchipara, New Market, Taltala and Posta.

== Demographics ==
As per 2011 Census of India Ward No. 22, Kolkata Municipal Corporation, had a total population of 15,730, of which 9,847 (63%) were males and 5,883 (37%) were females. Population below 6 years was 734. The total number of literates in Ward No. 22 was 12,757 (85.07% of the population over 6 years).

Kolkata is the second most literate district in West Bengal. The literacy rate of Kolkata district has increased from 53.0% in 1951 to 86.3% in the 2011 census.

See also – List of West Bengal districts ranked by literacy rate

Census data about mother tongue and religion is not available at the ward level. For district level information see Kolkata district.

According to the District Census Handbook Kolkata 2011, 141 wards of Kolkata Municipal Corporation formed Kolkata district. (3 wards were added later).

== List of councillors ==
The ward forms a city municipal corporation council electoral constituency and is a part of Jorasanko Assembly constituency.

Election	Councillor	Party
2005	Meena Devi Purohit	Bharatiya Janata Party
2010	Meena Devi Purohit	Bharatiya Janata Party
2015	Meena Devi Purohit	Bharatiya Janata Party
2021	Meena Devi Purohit	Bharatiya Janata Party

== Election results ==
=== 2021 ===
2021 Kolkata Municipal Corporation election: Ward No. 22
Party	Candidate	Votes	%	±%
BJP	Meena Devi Purohit	3,800	59.68	
TMC	Shyam Prakash Purohit	2,277	35.76	
INC	Nagesh Singh	247	3.88	
Independent	Remaining Independent Candidates	~43	0.67	
Majority		1,523	23.92	
Turnout		6,367		
BJP hold		Swing		
