= Kalikapur, Kolkata =

Kalikapur
- Neighbourhood in Kolkata (Calcutta)
- Location in Kolkata Kalikapur (West Bengal) Kalikapur (India)
- Coordinates: 22.5009°N 88.3949°E
- Country: India
- State: West Bengal
- City: Kolkata
- District: Kolkata
- Metro Station: Kavi Sukanta
- KMC wards: 104, 106, 109

Government
  - Type: Municipal Corporation
  - Body: Kolkata Municipal Corporation

Languages
  - Official: Bengali, English
- Time zone: UTC+5:30 (IST)
- PIN: 700099
- Telephone code: +91 33
- Lok Sabha constituency: Jadavpur
- Vidhan Sabha constituency: Jadavpur

Kalikapur is a locality of South Kolkata in West Bengal, India. It is surrounded by Haltu, Santoshpur and Mukundapur.
