= Ward No. 92, Kolkata Municipal Corporation =

Ward No. 92
- Kolkata Municipal Corporation
- Interactive Map Outlining Ward No. 92
- Location in Kolkata
- Coordinates (dms): 22.499833°N 88.369694°E
- Country: India
- State: West Bengal
- City: Kolkata
- Neighbourhoods: Dhakuria (Babu Bagan-Selimpur-Teli Para-Tanu Pukur), Jadavpur University, Garfa (Naskar Para-Shahid Nagar/ Sweet Land-Jheel Road/ Newland-Pal Bazar-Viveknagar-Pratapgarh)
- Reservation: Open
- Parliamentary constituency: Kolkata Dakshin
- Assembly constituency: Kasba
- Borough: 10

Government
  - Type: Mayor-Council
  - Body: KMC
  - Councillor: Madhuchhanda Deb
  - Party: CPI

Population (2011)
  - Total: 36,450
- Time zone: UTC+5:30 (IST)
- PIN: 700 031, 700 032
- Area code: +91 33

Ward No. 92, Kolkata Municipal Corporation is an administrative division of Kolkata Municipal Corporation in Borough No. 10, covering parts of Dhakuria (Babu Bagan-Selimpur-Teli Para-Tanu Pukur), Jadavpur University and Garfa (Naskar Para-Shahid Nagar/ Sweet Land-Jheel Road/ Newland-Pal Bazar-Viveknagar-Pratapgarh) neighbourhoods in South Kolkata, in the Indian state of West Bengal.

== History ==
The establishment and evolution of Kolkata Municipal Corporation followed a long process starting from around the middle of the 19th century. The Municipal Consolidation Act of 1888 and certain steps taken thereafter saw the addition of peripheral areas in the eastern and southern parts of the city to the corporation area. In 1888, there were 75 commissioners, 50 of whom were elected, 15 appointed by the government and 10 nominated from bodies like Chambers of Commerce, Trades Associations and the Port Commissioners. The Calcutta Municipal Act of 1923 brought about important changes. The adjacent municipalities of Cossipore, Chitpore, Manicktola and Garden Reach were amalgamated with Kolkata. Garden Reach was later taken out.

Post-independence developments saw the introduction of adult franchise in municipal elections in 1962. The number of wards increased from 75 to 100. Tollygunge was merged with Kolkata in 1953. The Calcutta Municipal Corporation Act 1980, which came into effect in 1984, extended the boundaries of Kolkata by including South Suburban, Garden Reach and Jadavpur municipalities in Kolkata. With the addition of Joka to Kolkata, the number of wards rose to 144.

== Geography ==
Ward No. 92 is bordered on the north by Sarat Ghosh Garden Road and Budge Budge branch of Eastern Railway; on the east by Kalipada Roy Lane, Jheel Road and the western boundary of former Haltu Union Board; on the south by Jadavpur Station Road, Garfa Road and the northern boundary of former Haltu Union Board; and on the west by Raja Subodh Chandra Mullick Road and Gariahat Road (South).

Location of Ward No. 92 in Kolkata Ward Map

The ward is served by Kasba and Jadavpur police stations of Kolkata Police.

Patuli Women police station has jurisdiction over all police districts under the jurisdiction of South Suburban Division i.e. Netaji Nagar, Jadavpur, Kasba, Regent Park, Bansdroni, Garfa and Patuli.

== Demographics ==
As per the 2011 Census of India, Ward No. 92, Kolkata Municipal Corporation, had a total population of 36,450, of which 17,865 (49%) were males and 18,585 (51%) were females. Population below 6 years was 1,791. The total number of literates in Ward No. 92 was 32,417 (93.53% of the population over 6 years).

Kolkata is the second most literate district in West Bengal. The literacy rate of Kolkata district has increased from 53.0% in 1951 to 86.3% in the 2011 census.

See also – List of West Bengal districts ranked by literacy rate

Literacy in KMC wards

North Kolkata
Ward No. 1 – 86.12%
Ward No. 2 – 94.24%
Ward No. 3 – 86.74%
Ward No. 4 – 89.27%
Ward No. 5 – 90.32%
Ward No. 6 – 81.12%
Ward No. 7 – 87.65%
Ward No. 8 – 93.57%
Ward No. 9 – 91.60%
Ward No. 10 – 92.38%
Ward No. 11 – 87.96%
Ward No. 12 – 84.95%
Ward No. 13 – 83.39%
Ward No. 14 – 87.87%
Ward No. 15 – 88.89%
Ward No. 16 – 88.62%
Ward No. 17 – 92.30%
Ward No. 18 – 78.72%
Ward No. 19 – 89.29%
Ward No. 20 – 85.93%
Ward No. 21 – 78.12%
Ward No. 22 – 85.07%
Ward No. 23 – 71.14%
Ward No. 24 – 73.16%
Ward No. 25 – 85.49%
Ward No. 26 – 82.34%
Ward No. 27 – 88.19%
Ward No. 28 – 79.39%
Ward No. 29 – 70.69%
Ward No. 30 – 88.71%
Ward No. 31 – 88.28%
Ward No. 32 – 75.73%
Ward No. 33 – 91.17%
Central Kolkata
Ward No. 34 – 92.79%
Ward No. 35 – 91.44%
Ward No. 36 – 66.34%
Ward No. 37 – 79.12%
Ward No. 38 – 85.77%
Ward No. 39 – 73.27%
Ward No. 40 – 88.14%
Ward No. 41 – 83.53%
Ward No. 42 – 75.02%
Ward No. 43 – 79.52%
Ward No. 44 – 79.09%
Ward No. 45 – 74.69%
Ward No. 46 – 85.38%
Ward No. 47 – 87.87%
Ward No. 48 – 82.04%
Ward No. 49 – 65.51%
Ward No. 50 – 88.70%
Ward No. 51 – 93.01%
Ward No. 52 – 86.18%
Ward No. 53 – 89.49%
Ward No. 54 – 82.10%
Ward No. 55 – 84.84%
Ward No. 56 – 85.53%
Ward No. 57 – 80.20%
Ward No. 58 – 74.35%
Ward No. 59 – 80.39%
Ward No. 60 – 74.04%
Ward No. 61 – 80.54%
Ward No. 62 – 86.04%
Ward No. 63 – 84.39%
Ward No. 64 – 85.21%
Ward No. 65 – 81.60%
South Kolkata
Ward No. 66 – 80.95%
Ward No. 67 – 89.52%
Ward No. 68 – 90.86%
Ward No. 69 – 86.07%
Ward No. 70 – 94.20%
Ward No. 71 – 92.01%
Ward No. 72 – 90.06%
Ward No. 73 – 89.28%
Ward No. 74 – 84.56%
Ward No. 75 – 80.27%
Ward No. 76 – 88.40%
Ward No. 77 – 83.84%
Ward No. 78 – 83.00%
Ward No. 79 – 81.96%
Ward No. 80 – 71.89%
Ward No. 81 – 85.14%
Ward No. 82 – 84.82%
Ward No. 83 – 85.63%
Ward No. 84 – 85.71%
Ward No. 85 – 88.19%
Ward No. 86 – 89.61%
Ward No. 87 – 90.26%
Ward No. 88 – 85.09%
Ward No. 89 – 92.40%
Ward No. 90 – 84.60%
Ward No. 91 – 90.57%
Ward No. 92 – 93.53%
Ward No. 93 – 91.30%
Ward No. 94 – 89.11%
Ward No. 95 – 95.61%
Ward No. 96 – 96.57%
Ward No. 97 – 94.60%
Ward No. 98 – 96.24%
Ward No. 99 – 95.79%
Ward No. 100 – 95.98%
Ward No. 101 – 95.36%
Ward No. 102 – 93.53%
Ward No. 103 – 94.77%
Ward No. 104 – 96.03%
Ward No. 105 – 93.86%
Ward No. 106 – 92.97%
Ward No. 107 – 90.06%
Ward No. 108 – 80.74%
Ward No. 109 – 85.49%
Ward No. 110 – 91.35%
Ward No. 111 – 93.36%
Ward No. 112 – 92.50%
Ward No. 113 – 92.18%
Ward No. 114 – 91.13%
Ward No. 115 – 95.53%
Ward No. 116 – 86.91%
Ward No. 117 – 86.53%
Ward No. 118 – 90.04%
Ward No. 119 – 94.04%
Ward No. 120 – 92.15%
Ward No. 121 – 91.86%
Ward No. 122 – 92.88%
Ward No. 123 – 93.42%
Ward No. 124 – 92.55%
Ward No. 125 – 92.50%
Ward No. 126 – 93.78%
Ward No. 127 – 91.82%
Ward No. 128 – 92.67%
Ward No. 129 – 92.56%
Ward No. 130 – 95.55%
Ward No. 131 – 93.48%
Ward No. 132 – 90.30%
Ward No. 133 – 83.48%
Ward No. 134 – 73.75%
Ward No. 135 – 75.75%
Ward No. 136 – 85.01%
Ward No. 137 – 79.16%
Ward No. 138 – 78.67%
Ward No. 139 – 77.56%
Ward No. 140 – 79.93%
Ward No. 141 – 75.15%
Note: The regional distribution
is a broad one and
there is some overlapping
2011 Census: Ward-Wise

Primary Census Abstract Data

Census data about mother tongue and religion is not available at the ward level. For district level information see Kolkata district.

According to the District Census Handbook Kolkata 2011, 141 wards of Kolkata Municipal Corporation formed Kolkata district. (3 wards were added later).

== List of councillors ==
The ward forms a city municipal corporation council electoral constituency and is a part of Kasba Assembly constituency.

Election	Councillor	Party
2005	Madhuchhanda Deb	Communist Party of India
2010	Madhuchhanda Deb	Communist Party of India
2015	Madhuchhanda Deb	Communist Party of India
2021	Madhuchhanda Deb	Communist Party of India

== Election results ==
=== 2021 ===
2021 Kolkata Municipal Corporation election: Ward No. 92
Party	Candidate	Votes	%	±%
CPI	Madhuchhanda Deb	10,248	56.38	
TMC	Abhishek Mukherjee	6,824	37.56	
BJP	Suman Das	807	4.44	
INC	Manash Kumar Bhadra	138	0.76	
Independent	Subal Sardar	75	0.41	
Independent	Sabyasachi Paul	50	0.28	
Independent	Sanjoy Giri	33	0.18	
Turnout		18,181		
CPI hold		Swing		

=== 2015 ===
2015 Kolkata Municipal Corporation election: Ward No. 92
Party	Candidate	Votes	%	±%
CPI	Madhuchhanda Deb	11,485	55.35	
TMC	Saroj Bhowmick (Patang)	6,971	33.60	
BJP	Dilip Kumar Mitra	1,754	8.45	
INC	Pankaj Kumar Nath	268	1.29	
Independent	Susmita Sengupta	117	0.56	
Independent	Basudev Saha	101	0.49	
Independent	Sarbajit Neogi	52	0.25	
Turnout		20,748	65.61	
CPI hold		Swing		

=== 2010 ===
2010 Kolkata Municipal Corporation election: Ward No. 92
Party	Candidate	Votes	%	±%
CPI	Madhuchhanda Deb	9,616	48.64	
TMC	Ratan Dey	9,074	45.90	
INC	Pankaj Kumar Nath	476	2.40	
BJP	Dilip Kumar Mitra	290	1.46	
CPI(ML)L	Manas Chatterjee	154	0.77	
Independent	Kamalini Mondal	90	0.45	
Independent	Sanjoy Das	67	0.33	
Turnout		19,767	64.30	
CPI hold		Swing		
