= Haltu =

- Neighbourhood in Kolkata (Calcutta)
- Location in Kolkata Haltu (West Bengal) Haltu (India)
- Coordinates: 22.5048°N 88.3885°E
- Country: India
- State: West Bengal
- City: Kolkata
- District: Kolkata
- Metro Station: Kavi Sukanta
- KMC wards: 104, 105, 106, 107, 109

Government
  - Type: Municipal Corporation
  - Body: Kolkata Municipal Corporation

Languages
  - Official: Bengali, English
- Time zone: UTC+5:30 (IST)
- PIN: 700075, 700078, 700099
- Telephone code: +91 33
- Lok Sabha constituency: Kolkata Dakshin and Jadavpur
- Vidhan Sabha constituency: Jadavpur

Haltu is a neighbourhood of South Kolkata in West Bengal, India. It is mainly a residential area surrounded with Kasba, Jadavpur, Dhakuria, Kalikapur and Selimpur.

== Transport ==
Garfa Main Road and Kalikapur Road intersect here. The area is well connected with Kolkata's Bus network.

=== Bus ===
==== Private Bus ====
- 1 Ramnagar - Mukundapur
- 212 Howrah Station - Palbazar
- SD8 Bibirhat - Nandi Bagan

=== Train ===
Ballygunge Junction railway station, Dhakuria railway station and Jadavpur railway station are the nearest railway stations.

== Education ==
List of educational institutions situated in Haltu area are:

- Haltu High school for boys
- Haltu High school for girls
- Haltu Kishalaya Sikhsha Sadan
- Academy for Musical Excellence

== Markets ==
Haltu neighbourhood has two well known markets.

- Haltu Bazar
- Ramlal Bazar

== See also ==
- Jadavpur
- Garfa
