= Charu Market =

- Neighbourhood in Kolkata (Calcutta)
- Location in Kolkata
- Coordinates: 22.5073°N 88.3457°E
- Country: India
- State: West Bengal
- City: Kolkata
- District: Kolkata
- Metro Station: Rabindra Sarobar
- Municipal Corporation: Kolkata Municipal Corporation
- KMC wards: 89
- Elevation: 36 ft (11 m)

Population
  - Total: For population see linked KMC ward pages
- Time zone: UTC+5:30 (IST)
- Area code: +91 33
- Lok Sabha constituency: Kolkata Dakshin
- Vidhan Sabha constituency: Rashbehari; Tollygunge (Previously)

Charu Market is a locality of South Kolkata in Kolkata district in the Indian state of West Bengal. It is a part of Tollygunge area.

== Geography ==
=== Police district ===
Charu Market police station is located at 28, Deshpran Sashmal Road, Kolkata-700033.

Tollygunge Women's police station has jurisdiction over all the police districts in the South Division, i.e. Park Street, Shakespeare Sarani, Alipore, Hastings, Maidan, Bhowanipore, Kalighat, Tollygunge, Charu Market, New Alipur and Chetla.

== Economy ==
=== Daily markets ===
Charu Chandra Market at 54/1 Charu Chandra Avenue is a private road-side market spread across 0.66 acres. Vegetables, fruits, betel leaf, fish, meat, egg and grocery are available.
