= Burtolla =

Burtolla Bartala
- Neighborhood of Kolkata
- Location in Kolkata
- Coordinates: 22.592906°N 88.370711°E
- Country: India
- State: West Bengal
- City: Kolkata
- District: Kolkata
- Metro Station: Shobhabazar Sutanuti and Shyambazar
- Municipal Corporation: Kolkata Municipal Corporation
- KMC ward: 11

Population
  - Total: For population see linked KMC ward page
- Time zone: UTC+5:30 (IST)
- Area code: +91 33
- Lok Sabha constituency: Kolkata Uttar
- Vidhan Sabha constituency: Maniktala

Burtolla (also spelt as Bartala) is a neighbourhood of North Kolkata in Kolkata district in the Indian state of West Bengal.

== Etymology ==
It was named after the twin banyan (bar or bat in Bengali) that stood there. The Rajas of Sobhabazar had ordered severe punishment for those attempting to damage the trees, and even death for those trying to cut them down.

== History ==
In 1888, one of the 25 newly organized police section houses was located in Burtolla. (For more information see Dihi Panchannagram.)

== Geography ==
=== Police district ===
Burtolla police station is part of the North and North Suburban Division of Kolkata Police. It is located at 1, Raja Rajkrishna Strret, Kolkata-700006.

Amherst Street Women police station covers all police districts under the jurisdiction of the North and North Suburban division i.e. Amherst Street, Jorabagan, Shyampukur, Cossipore, Chitpur, Sinthi, Burtolla and Tala.
