= Kavi Sukanta metro station =

Metro station in Kolkata, India

Kavi Sukanta
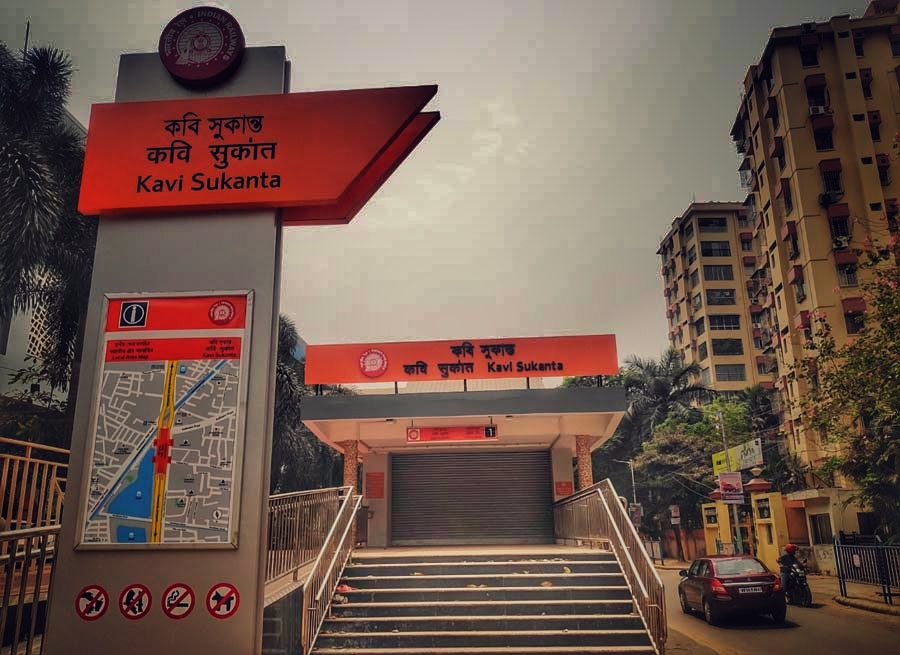

General information
- Location: Kalikapur, EM Bypass; Kolkata, West Bengal 700107; India
- Coordinates: 22.505262°N 88.400996°E
- System: Kolkata Metro
- Operator: Metro Railway, Kolkata
- Line: Orange Line
- Platforms: 2 (2 side platforms)

Construction
- Structure type: Elevated

Other information
- Station code: KKSK

History
- Opened: 6 March 2024; 2 years ago
- Former names: Kalikapur

Services
Preceding station	Kolkata Metro	Following station
Jyotirindra Nandi towards Kavi Subhash	Orange Line	Hemanta Mukhopadhyay towards Beleghata
Route map
Location

Kavi Sukanta is a metro station of Orange Line of the Kolkata Metro in Kalikapur, a southern neighbourhood of Kolkata, India, serving the areas of Kalikapur, Haltu and Nandi Bagan. The station is named in honour of the revolutionary Bengali poet Sukanta Bhattacharya.

== History ==
This project was sanctioned in the budget of 2010–11 by Mamata Banerjee with a project deadline of six years. The execution of this project was entrusted to RVNL at a cost of Rs 3951.98 crore. It will help to reduce travel time between the southern fringes of Kolkata to Netaji Subhas Chandra Bose International Airport.

The 5 km (3.1 mi) stretch from New Garia to Ruby Hospital was expected to start from 2018. Until then, the station and associated metro viaduct connections were fully completed with trail runs being conducted over this and other phase 1 stations. RVNL planned to launch the metro over this truncated route before this year's Durga Puja, but was postponed due to signalling issues.

The Kavi Subhash–Hemanta Mukhopadhyay section of Orange Line was inaugurated on 7 March 2024.

== The Station ==
=== Structure ===
Kavi Sukanta Metro Station on the Orange Line of Kolkata Metro is structurally an elevated metro station. The station has three levels. Station entrances and exits begin or end at the first level or ground level. The second level or L1 or intermediate level houses station fare control, station agents, metro card vending machines, and crossovers. The third level or L2 or the final level houses the platforms and rail tracks. The station is 200 meters long and 25 meters wide.

=== Layout ===
L2	Side platform, Doors will open on the left
L2	Platform 2	Train towards Beleghata (Hemanta Mukhopadhyay) →
L2	Platform 1	← Train towards Kavi Subhash (Jyotirindra Nandi)
L2	Side platform, Doors will open on the left
L1	Concourse	Fare control, station agent, Metro QR ticket vending machines, crossover
G	Street level	Exit/Entrance

=== Location ===
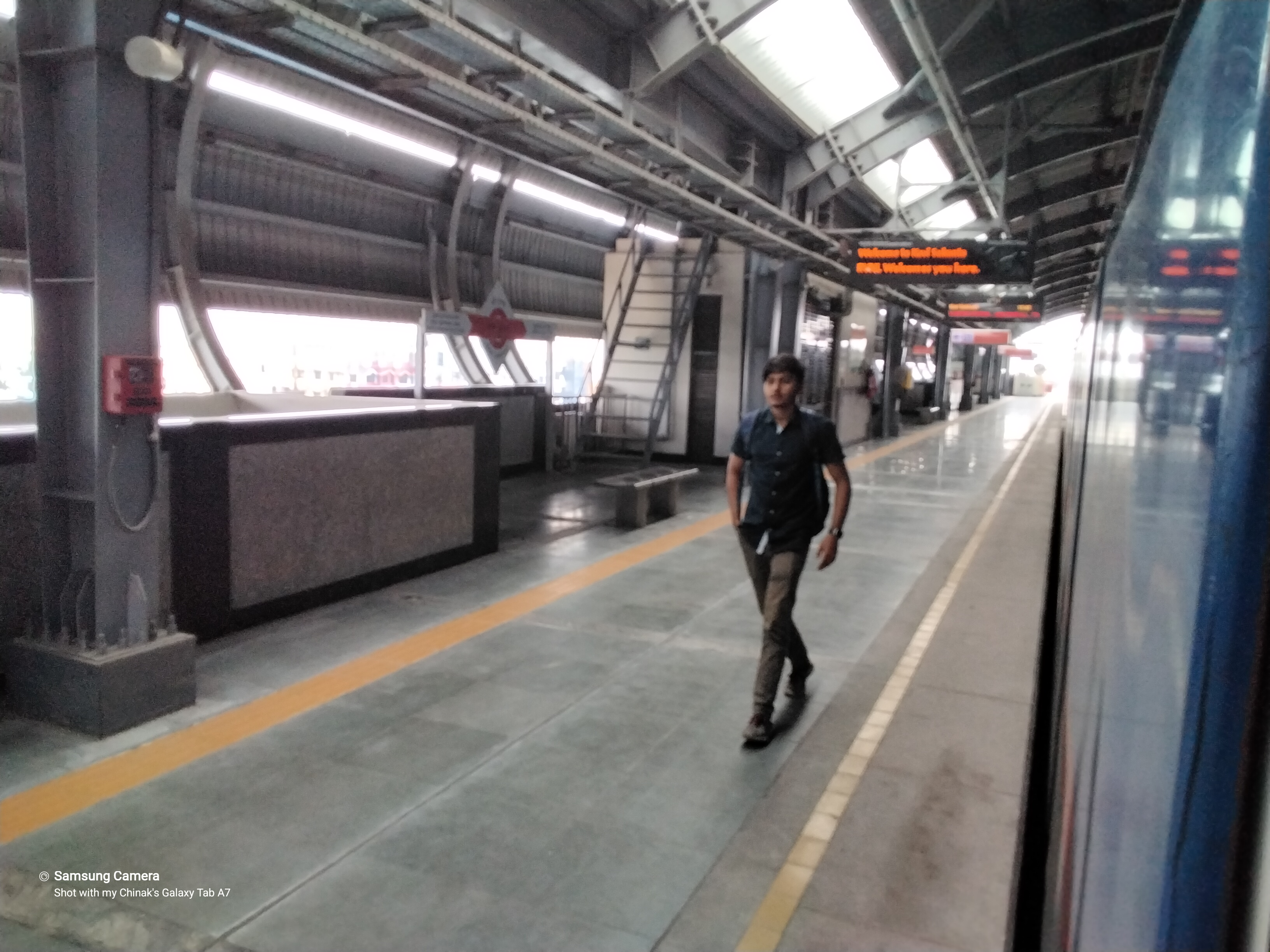
Kavi Sukanta platform

This station is close to multi-storey buildings and offices near Ruby Crossing so residents from Central and South Kolkata can comfortably reach via combined Blue Line and Orange Line route, then finally boarding off this station. The previous station of the station is Jyotirindra Nandi Metro Station at a distance of 1.6 km and the next station is Hemanta Mukhopadhyay Metro Station at a distance of 1.4 km away.

=== Infrastructure ===
The station is being built with state-of-the-art technology. The station has four entrances and exits for entry and exit. A number of lifts, staircases and elevators are attached to the reach the concourse building. The second level of the station has ticket collection center, ticket validator for ticket examination. The station will have escalators for the convenience of passengers. The station will have drinking water and toilet facilities.

== Electricity and signal systems ==
Like the other stations and lines of the Kolkata Metro, this station will use 750 volts DC power supply by the third railway to operate the trains.

Train movement will be conducted at this station and on the railway by communication-based train control signal system. This signal system can operate a 90 second interval train. Currently this automatic signalling system is not activated and only one metro track is operational.

== See also ==
- List of Kolkata Metro stations

== See also ==
- List of Kolkata Metro stations
