= Garfa =

- Neighbourhood in Kolkata (Calcutta)
- Location in Kolkata
- Coordinates: 22°30′10.65″N 88°22′17.46″E
- Country: India
- State: West Bengal
- City: Kolkata
- District: South 24 Parganas
- Metro Station: Kavi Sukanta
- KMC Ward: 104, 105
- Municipal Corporation: Kolkata Municipal Corporation
- Elevation: 36 ft (11 m)
- Time zone: UTC+5:30 (IST)
- PIN: 700075, 700078
- Area code: +91 33
- Lok Sabha constituency: Jadavpur
- Vidhan Sabha constituency: Kasba and Jadavpur

Garfa is a locality of South Kolkata in West Bengal, India. It is a part of Jadavpur area.

== Geography ==
Garfa police station is in the South Suburban division of Kolkata Police. It is located at Garfa Deaf and Dumb School Premises.

Patuli Women police station has jurisdiction over all police districts under the jurisdiction of the South Suburban Division i.e. Netaji Nagar, Jadavpur, Bansdroni, Garfa, and Patuli.

Jadavpur, Thakurpukur, Behala, Tiljala, Metiabruz, Purba Jadavpur, Nadial, and Kasba police stations were transferred from South 24 Parganas to Kolkata in 2011. Except for Metiabruz, all the police stations were split into two. The newest police stations are in Parnasree, Haridevpur, Garfa, Patuli, Survey Park, Pragati Maidan, Bansdroni, and Rajabagan.

== Transport ==
Garfa Main Road and Kalikapur Road intersects near Garfa. Buses ply along both roads. Auto rickshaws, app-based cab services such as Ola, Uber, and taxies are also available.

Dhakuria railway station and Jadavpur railway station are the nearest railway stations.

== Education ==
Here is a list of educational institutions situated near Garfa area.

- Garfa Dhirendranath Memorial Boys' High School
- Garfa Dhirendranath Memorial Girls' High School

== See also ==
- Jadavpur
- Haltu
