= Indranil Khan =

Indian politician in West Bengal

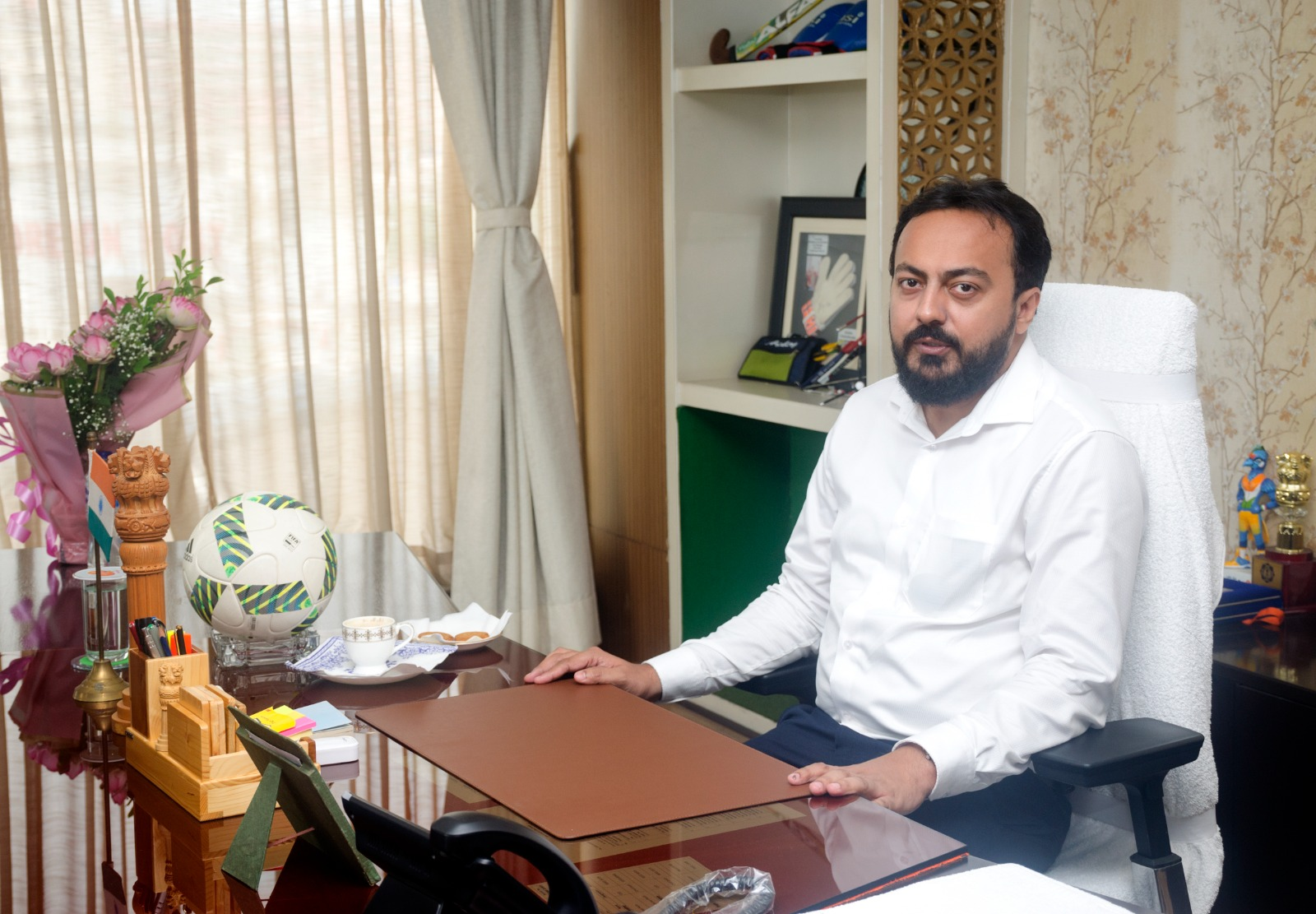

Minister of State (Independent Charge), Government of West Bengal
- Incumbent
- Assumed office 1 June 2026
- Governor: R. N. Ravi
- Chief Minister: Suvendu Adhikari
- Departments: Department of Youth Services and Sports; Department of Consumer Affairs
- Preceded by: Nisith Pramanik

Member of the West Bengal Legislative Assembly
- Incumbent
- Assumed office 4 May 2026
- Preceded by: Partha Chatterjee
- Constituency: Behala Paschim

Personal details
- Born: 1989 (age 36–37) Kolkata, West Bengal, India
- Party: Bharatiya Janata Party
- Profession: Politician; Doctor

Dr. Indranil Khan (born 1989) is a politician and oncologist from West Bengal. He is a member of West Bengal Legislative Assembly, elected from Behala Paschim Assembly constituency in 2026. He is a member of Bharatiya Janata Party. He is an alumnus of South Point School, Kolkata, West Bengal.He is currently serving as the Minister of State (Independent Charge) for Youth Affairs and Sports & Consumer Affairs of West Bengal.
