= Behala Paschim Assembly constituency =

West Bengal Legislative Assembly constituency

Behala Paschim
- Constituency No. 154 for the West Bengal Legislative Assembly
- Interactive Map Outlining Behala Paschim Assembly Constituency

Constituency details
- Country: India
- Region: East India
- State: West Bengal
- District: South 24 Parganas
- Lok Sabha constituency: Kolkata Dakshin
- Established: 1951
- Total electors: 313,005
- Reservation: None

Member of Legislative Assembly
- 18th West Bengal Legislative Assembly
- Incumbent Indranil Khan
- Party: BJP
- Alliance: NDA
- Elected year: 2026

Behala Paschim Assembly constituency (earlier known as Behala West Assembly constituency) is a Legislative Assembly constituency of South 24 Parganas District in the Indian state of West Bengal.

== Overview ==
As per order of the Delimitation Commission in respect of the Delimitation of constituencies in the West Bengal, Behala Paschim Assembly constituency is composed of the following:

- Ward Nos. 118, 119, 125, 126, 127, 128, 129, 130, 131 and 132 of Kolkata Municipal Corporation.

Borough	Ward No.	Councillor	2021 Winner
XIII	118	Tarak Singh	Trinamool Congress
XIII	119	Kakali Bag	Trinamool Congress
XVI	125	Chhanda Sarkar	Trinamool Congress
XVI	126	Ghanasree Bagh	Trinamool Congress
XIV	127	Malobika Baidya	Trinamool Congress
XIV	128	Partha Sarkar	Trinamool Congress
XIV	129	Sanhita Das	Trinamool Congress
XIV	130	Avijit Mukherjee	Trinamool Congress
XIV	131	Ratna Chatterjee	Trinamool Congress
XIV	132	Sanchita Mitra	Trinamool Congress

Behala Paschim Assembly constituency is part of No. 23 Kolkata Dakshin Lok Sabha constituency.

== Members of the Legislative Assembly ==
Year	Name	Party
Behala
1952	Biren Roy	All India Forward Bloc (Ruikar)
1957	Rabindra Nath Mukhopadhyay	Communist Party of India
1962	Rabindra Nath Mukhopadhyay	Communist Party of India
Behala West
1967	Rabin Mukherjee	Communist Party of India (Marxist)
1969	Rabin Mukherjee	Communist Party of India (Marxist)
1971	Rabin Mukherjee	Communist Party of India (Marxist)
1972	Biswanath Chakraborty	Communist Party of India
1977	Rabin Mukherjee	Communist Party of India (Marxist)
1982	Rabin Mukherjee	Communist Party of India (Marxist)
1987	Rabin Mukherjee	Communist Party of India (Marxist)
1991	Nirmal Mukherjee	Communist Party of India (Marxist)
1996	Nirmal Mukherjee	Communist Party of India (Marxist)
2001	Partha Chatterjee	Trinamool Congress
2006	Partha Chatterjee	Trinamool Congress
Major boundary changes; constituency renamed as Behala Paschim
2011	Partha Chatterjee	Trinamool Congress
2016	Partha Chatterjee	Trinamool Congress
2021	Partha Chatterjee	Trinamool Congress
2026	Indranil Khan	Bharatiya Janata Party

== Election results ==
=== 2026 ===
In 2026, Indranil Khan defeated the TMC, ending their 25- year rule in the constituency.

2026 West Bengal Legislative Assembly election: Behala Paschim
Party	Candidate	Votes	%	±%
BJP	Indranil Khan	113,171	47.39	▲19.83
AITC	Ratna Chatterjee	88,472	37.05	▼12.46
CPI(M)	Nihar Bhakta	30,676	12.85	▼7.64
NOTA	None of the above	1,484	0.62	▼0.43
Majority		24,699	10.34	▼11.61
Turnout		238,796	89.66	▲15.64
BJP gain from AITC		Swing		

=== 2021 ===
2021 West Bengal Legislative Assembly election: Behala Paschim
Party	Candidate	Votes	%	±%
AITC	Partha Chatterjee	114,778	49.51	
BJP	Srabanti Chatterjee	63,894	27.56	
CPI(M)	Nihar Bhakta	47,509	20.49	
NOTA	None of the above	2,433	1.05	
Majority		50,884	21.95	
Turnout		231,816	74.02	
AITC hold		Swing		

=== 2016 ===
In the 2016 elections, Partha Chatterjee of Trinamool Congress defeated his nearest rival Kaustav Chatterjee of CPI(M).

2016 West Bengal Legislative Assembly election: Behala Paschim
Party	Candidate	Votes	%	±%
AITC	Partha Chatterjee	1,02,114	46.90	−16.06
CPI(M)	Kaustav Chatterjee	93,218	42.80	+8.90
BJP	Harikrishna Dutta	17,962	8.20	+6.11
NOTA	None of the above	4,137	1.86	N/A
SUCI(C)	Mrityunjoy Roy	1,494	0.70	N/A
Majority		8,896	4.01	−24.96
Turnout		2,22,253	75.49	−1.90
AITC hold		Swing		

.# Swing calculated on LF+Congress vote percentages taken together in 2016.

=== 2011 ===
In the 2011 elections, Partha Chatterjee of Trinamool Congress defeated his nearest rival Anupam Deb Sarkar of CPI(M).

2011 West Bengal Legislative Assembly election: Behala Paschim
Party	Candidate	Votes	%	±%
AITC	Partha Chatterjee	1,27,870	62.96	10.57#
CPI(M)	Anupam Debsarkar	68,849	33.90	−11.54
BJP	Amalendu Roy Chowdhary	4,248	2.09	
IND	Jayanta Datta	2,140	1.05	
Majority		59,021	29.06	
Turnout		2,03,218	77.87	
AITC hold		Swing	22.11#	

.# Swing calculated on Congress+Trinamool Congress vote percentages taken together in 2006.

=== 2006 ===
In the 2006 elections, Partha Chatterjee of Trinamool Congress defeated his nearest rival Niranjan Chatterjee of CPI(M).

West Bengal assembly elections, 2006: Behala Paschim constituency
Party	Candidate	Votes	%	±%
AITC	Partha Chatterjee	82,259	48.80	
CPI(M)	Niranjan Chatterjee	76,532	45.40	
INC	Anjali Mukherjee	5,979	3.60	
Independent	Samir Kumar Halder	1,062	0.60	
Independent	Tuhin Sarkar	999	0.60	
Independent	Ashoke Kumar Halder	957	0.60	
Independent	Nirmal Mukherjee	648	0.40	
Majority		5,727	3.4	
Turnout		168,504	74.7	
AITC hold		Swing		

.# Swing calculated on BJP+Trinamool Congress vote percentages taken together in 2006.

=== 2001 ===
Nirmal Mukherjee of CPI(M) defeated Kumud Bhattacharya of Congress in 1996, and Lakshmi Kanta Basu of Congress in 1991. Rabin Mukherjee of CPI(M) defeated Lakshmi Kanta Basu of Congress in 1987, Aruna Ghosh Dastidar of Congress in 1982 and Subodh Chandra Das of Congress in 1977.

=== 1972 ===
Biswanath Chakraborty of CPI won in 1972. Rabin Mukherjee of CPI(M) won in 1971, 1969 and 1967. Prior to that Behala was a single seat. Rabindra Nath Mukhopadhyay of CPI won the Behala seat in 1962 and 1957. In independent India's first election in 1952, Biren Roy of Forward Bloc (RG) won the Behala seat.
