= Biswanath Chakraborty =

Indian politician

Biswanath Chakraborty (born 1932) was an Indian politician from Behala.

Chakraborty was born on October 31, 1932 in Lodna (Bihar). He was the son of Dhananjay Chakraborty. Biswanath Chakraborty went to school at the Barisha High School in Behala. He would continue his studies in Calcutta at the Bangabasi College, the Ashutosh College and the Calcutta University - obtaining a Master of Arts degree. Chakraborty married Dipti, the couple had one daughter and two sons. Chakraborty worked as a lecturer, and was a member of the General Council of the West Bengal College and University Teachers Association. He served as a Commissioner of the South Suburban Municipality (Behala). He served as president and secretary of various schools in Behala.

The Communist Party of India fielded Chakraborty as its candidate for the Behala West seat in the 1971 West Bengal Legislative Assembly election, confronting the incumbent Communist Party of India (Marxist) legislator Rabin Mukherjee. Mukherjee retained the seat, with Chakraborty finishing in second place with 25,394 votes (43.07%). Chakraborty again stood as the CPI candidate for Behala West in the 1972 West Bengal Legislative Assembly election, this time defeating Mukherjee having obtained 31,939 votes (51.55%).
