= Tangra, Kolkata =

Tangra
- Neighbourhood in Kolkata (Calcutta)
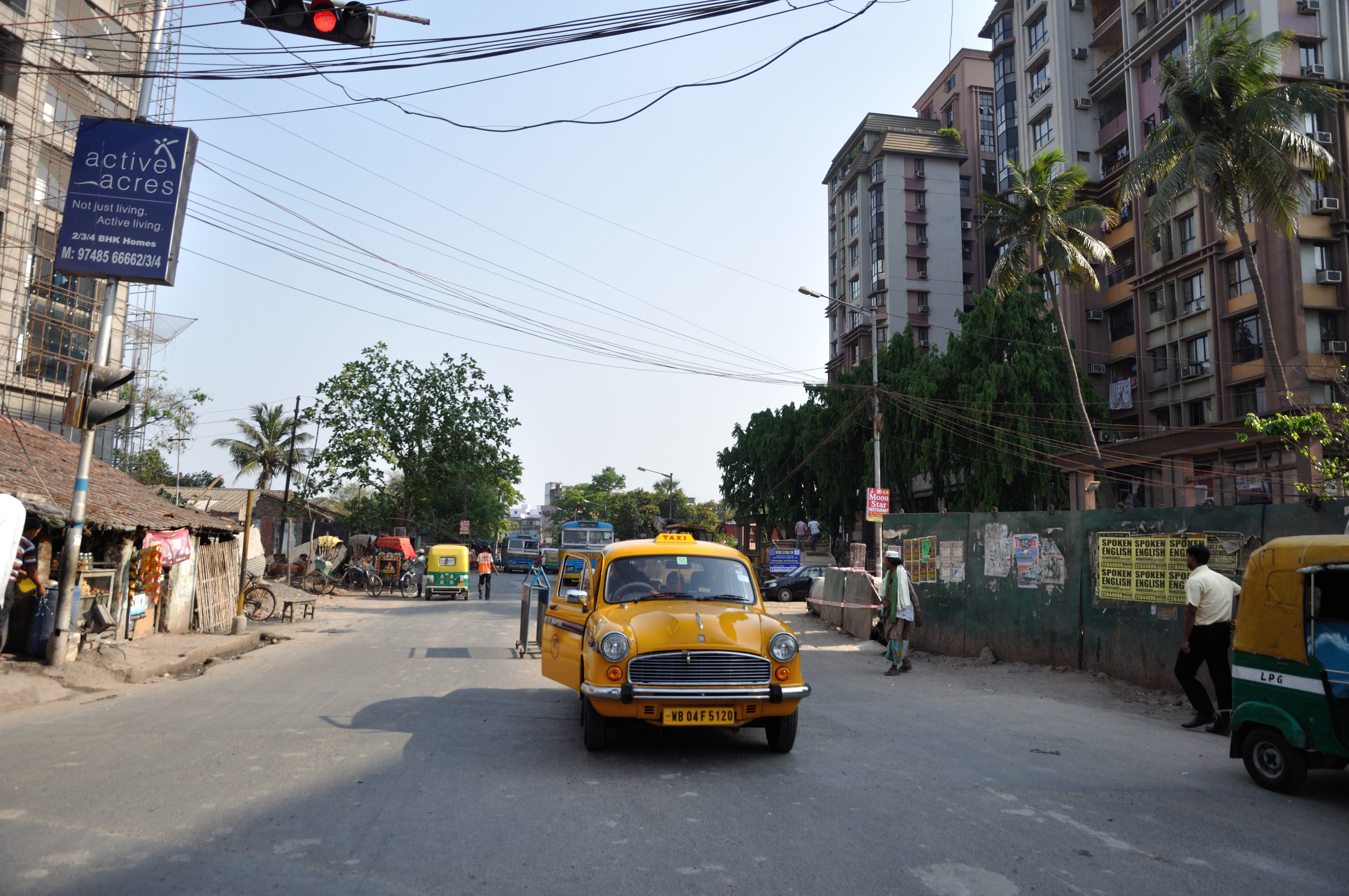
- Gobinda Chandra Khatik Road, Tangra

- Location in Kolkata
- Coordinates: 22.562434°N 88.386435°E
- Country: India
- State: West Bengal
- City: Kolkata
- District: Kolkata
- Metro Station: Sealdah, Beleghata(under construction) and Barun Sengupta(under construction)
- Municipal Corporation: Kolkata Municipal Corporation
- KMC wards: 56, 57, 58, 59, 66
- Elevation: 36 ft (11 m)

Population
  - Total: For population see linked KMC ward pages
- Time zone: UTC+5:30 (IST)
- PIN: 700015, 700046, 700105
- Area code: +91 33
- Lok Sabha constituency: Kolkata Uttar and Kolkata Dakshin
- Vidhan Sabha constituency: Beleghata, Entally and Kasba

Tangra is a region in East Kolkata that traditionally housed many tanneries owned by people of Hakka Chinese origin.

== History ==
The East India Company obtained from the Mughal emperor Farrukhsiyar, in 1717, the right to rent from 38 villages surrounding their settlement. Of these 5 lay across the Hooghly in what is now Howrah district. The remaining 33 villages were on the Calcutta side. After the fall of Siraj-ud-daulah, the last independent Nawab of Bengal, it purchased these villages in 1758 from Mir Jafar and reorganised them. These villages were known en-bloc as Dihi Panchannagram and Tangra was one of them. It was considered to be a suburb beyond the limits of the Maratha Ditch.

In the eastern fringes of Kolkata, the neighbourhoods such as Tangra, Tiljala, Topsia and Dhapa, were populated largely with people who migrated from poverty-ridden and caste-ridden villages, in Bihar and Uttar Pradesh. They came with dreams of a better life but landed in the slums with open drains, pigsties, factory chimneys and pungent chemicals. They found work in the tanneries and factories, and also engaged in menial work. A big proportion of them were Chamars, but there also were Doms, Dosads, Mehtars and Kahars. They were all Harijans and they formed a majority. They escaped from persecution they faced in their villages but were far removed from the mainstream of urban life and culture. The Cha Project is designed to preserve Tiretta Bazaar and develop Tangra.

== Geography ==
=== Police district ===
Tangra police station is in the Eastern Suburban division of Kolkata Police. It is located at 15, Gobinda Chandra Khatik Road, Kolkata-700015.

Ultadanga Women police station covers all police districts under the jurisdiction of the Eastern Suburban division i.e. Beliaghata, Entally, Manicktolla, Narkeldanga, Ultadanga, Tangra and Phoolbagan.

== Transport ==
=== Bus ===
==== Private Bus ====
- 24 Topsia - Bandhaghat
- 24A Topsia - Bandhaghat
- 213 Ghatakpukur - Babughat
- SD24 Sonakhali, Basanti - Alipore Zoo

==== Mini Bus ====
- S166 Tangra - Howrah Station

=== Train ===
Park Circus railway station on Sealdah South lines is the nearest railway station.

== Education ==
- D.N. De Homoeopathic Medical College & Hospital

=== Metro Rail ===
Barun Sengupta metro station (also known as Science City), is an under construction station of the Kolkata Metro Orange Line located at Parama Island on the EM Bypass is the nearest metro station.

== See also ==
- Chinese influences on Bengali cuisine
- Hakka Chinese
- Hakka cuisine
- Hakka people
- Indian Chinese cuisine
- Tiretta Bazaar
