= Topsia =

Neighbourhood in Kolkata, West Bengal, India

- Neighbourhood in Kolkata (Calcutta)
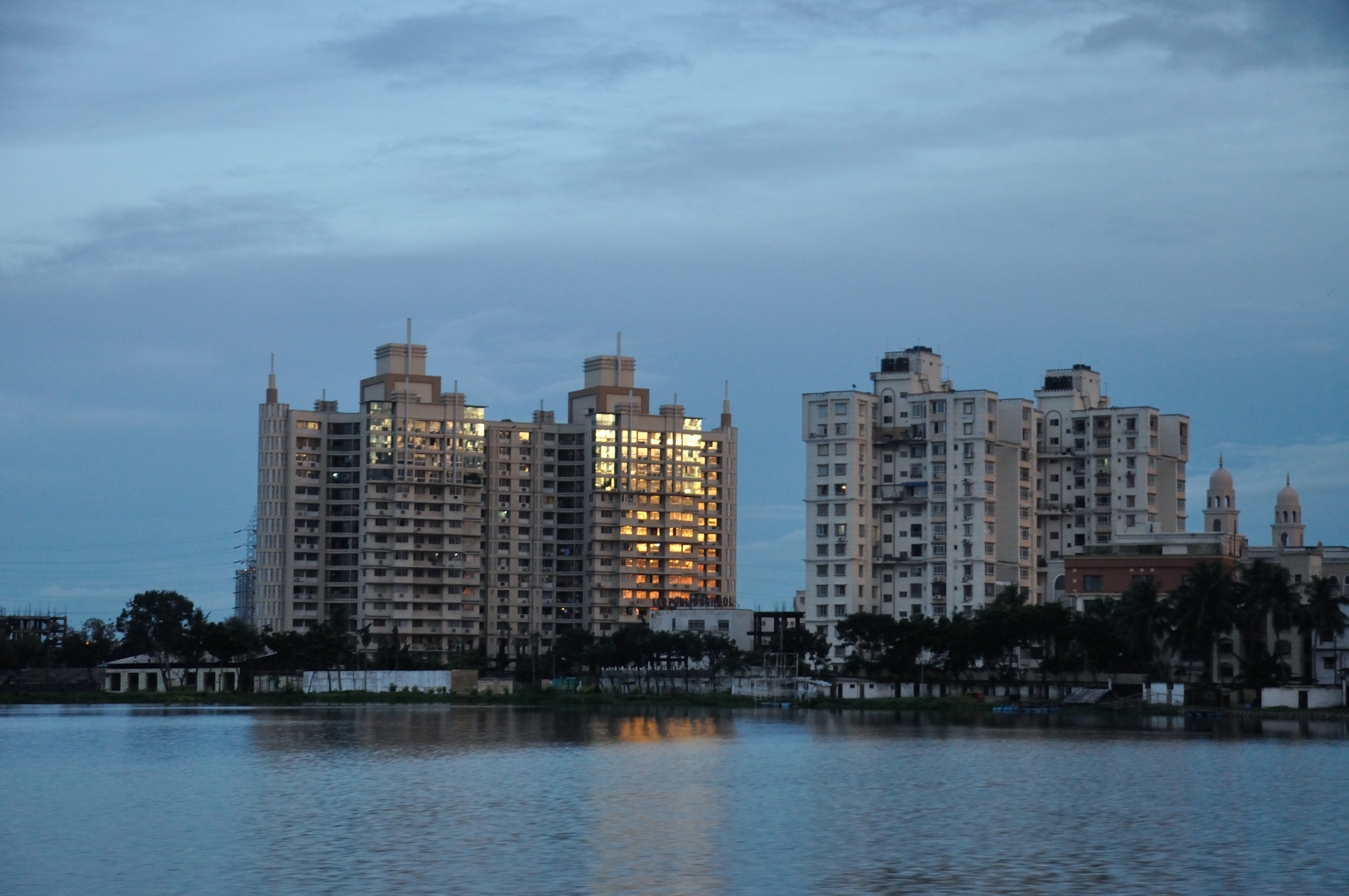
- Mirania Lake, Topsia

- Location in Kolkata
- Coordinates: 22.535861°N 88.389564°E
- Country: India
- State: West Bengal
- City: Kolkata
- District: Kolkata
- Metro Station: Barun Sengupta(under construction) and Ritwik Ghatak(under construction)
- Municipal Corporation: Kolkata Municipal Corporation
- KMC ward: 66

Government
  - Councillor: Faiz Ahmed Khan

Area
  - Total: 1.1 sq mi (2.8 km^{2})
- Elevation: 36 ft (11 m)

Population
  - Total: 94,809.
- Time zone: UTC+5:30 (IST)
- PIN: 700039, 700046, 700105
- Area code: +91 33
- Lok Sabha constituency: Kolkata Dakshin
- Vidhan Sabha constituency: Kasba

Topsia is a neighbourhood of East Kolkata, in West Bengal, India.

== History ==
The East India Company obtained from the Mughal emperor Farrukhsiyar, in 1717, the right to rent from 38 villages surrounding their settlement. Of these five lay across the Hooghly in what is now Howrah district. The remaining 33 villages were on the Calcutta side. After the fall of Siraj-ud-daulah, the last independent Nawab of Bengal, it purchased these villages in 1758 from Mir Jafar and reorganised them. These villages were known en-bloc as Dihi Panchannagram and Topsia was one of them. It was considered to be a suburb beyond the limits of the Maratha Ditch.

In the eastern fringes of Kolkata, the neighbourhoods such as Tangra, Tiljala, Topsia and Dhapa, were populated largely with people who migrated from poverty-stricken and caste-ridden villages, in Bihar and Uttar Pradesh. They came with dreams of a better life but landed in the slums with open drains, pigsties, factory chimneys and pungent chemicals. They found work in the tanneries and factories, and also engaged in menial work. A big proportion of them were Chamars, but there also were Doms, Dosads, Mehtars and Kahars. They were all Harijans and they formed a majority. They escaped from the petty persecution they faced in their villages but were far removed from mainstream urban life and culture. They have been here, living in depressing conditions, for more than a century.

== Geography ==
=== Police district ===
Topsia police station is one of the nine police stations in the South-east division of Kolkata Police. It is located at 106A, New Park Street, Kolkata-700017.

Karaya Women police station, has jurisdiction over all police districts under the jurisdiction of the South-east division, i.e. Topsia, Beniapukur, Ballygunge, Gariahat, Lake, Karaya, Rabindra Sarobar and Tiljala.

== Economy ==
Atmosphere by the Forum group, is a luxury condominium at Mirania Gardens in Topsia, beside EM Bypass. It consists of twin towers, both rising to a height of 499 feet, across 39 floors. Suspended between the twin towers at the top is a floating sky sculpture, named Deya, meaning cloud. The 100 m tubular sculpture has four levels. Forum Atmosphere is offering 5 BHK apartments, ranging in size from 6,000 to 8,750 sq feet. Each apartment has a private terrace and a garden. As of 2018, the project is in an advanced stage.

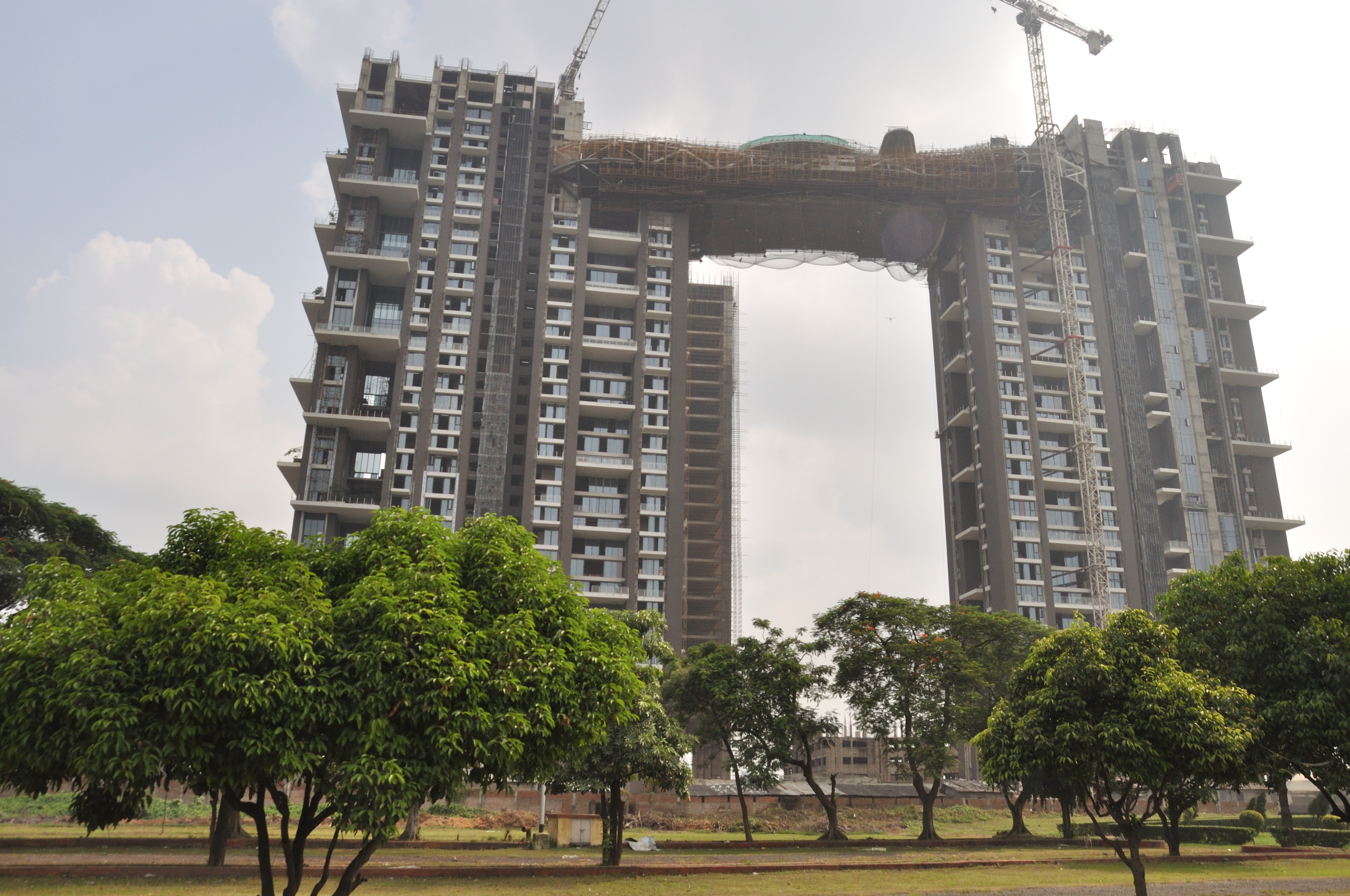
Atmosphere (Kolkata), EM Bypass, East Topsia

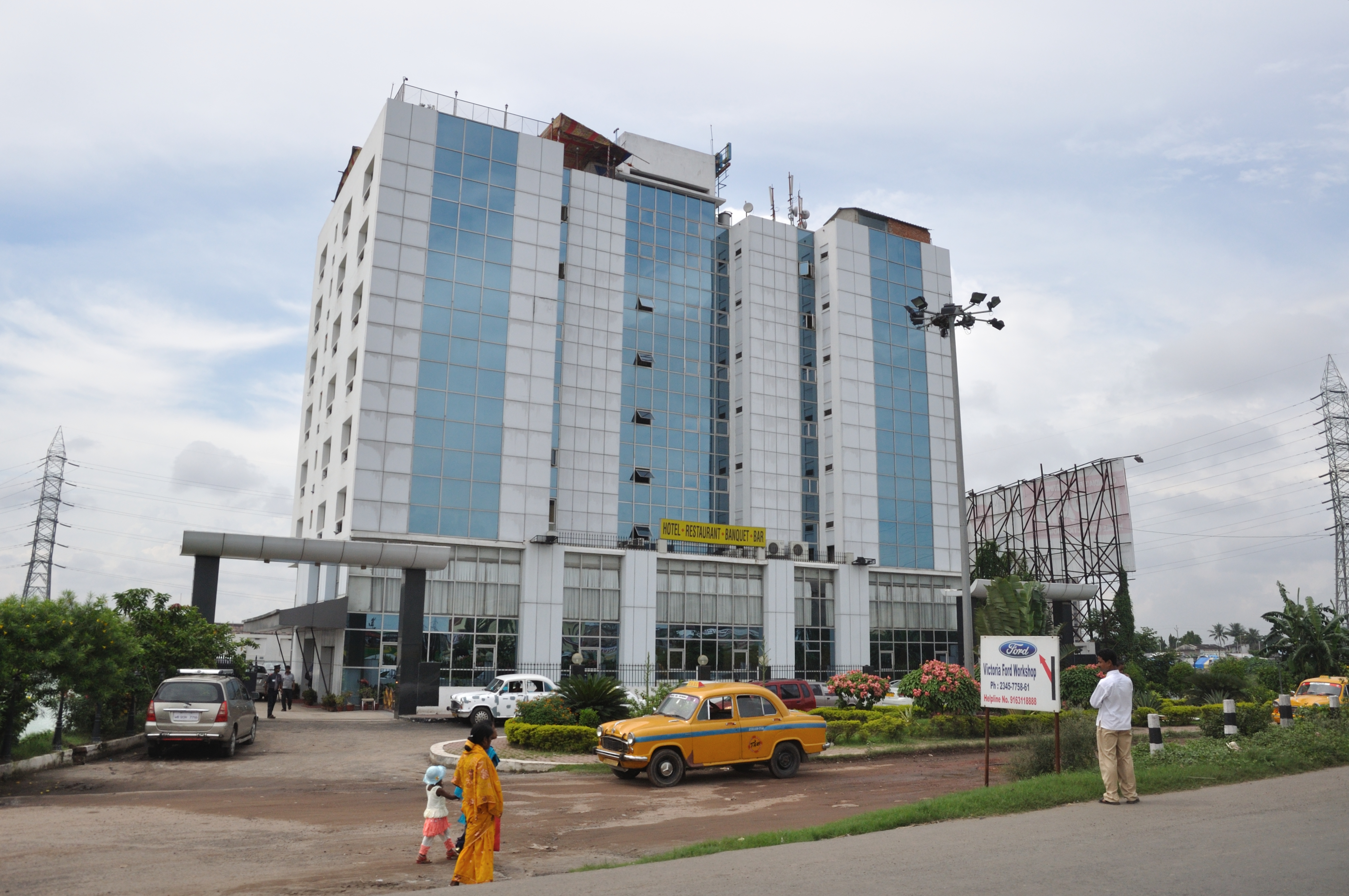
Landmark Hotel, EM Bypass, East Topsia

== Transport ==
=== Road ===
Topsia is located beside the junction of J.B.S. Haldane Avenue (Park Circus Connector) and E.M. Bypass. Gobinda Chandra Khatik Road/Ambedkar Sarani (towards Tangra) and Basanti Highway (part of SH 3) also start from here. Many buses ply along these roads.

Ambedkar Bridge is located on the eastern boundary of Topsia. The bridge connects Science City area with Panchannagram-VIP Bazar along E.M. Bypass, over a canal. The bridge was firstly inaugurated in 2002.

=== Train ===
Park Circus railway station on Sealdah South lines is the nearest railway station.

=== Metro Rail ===
Ritwik Ghatak metro station (formerly known as Topsia), is an under construction station of the Kolkata Metro Orange Line located in the Topsia area of Kolkata, West Bengal, India, which will be serving Topsia and Uttar Panchanagram areas soon.

== Education ==
- Narayana School
- Jugnu Free Primary School(Bengali)
- Monu Memorial School(Bengali/Urdu),
- Huda Public School,
- The Children's Academy,
- Tiljala Brajanath Vidyapith,
- Aulad Hossain Islamic academy school.
- Central Collegiate School,
- Royal Grammar School,
- Kings Park high school and The Crescent English School, a higher secondary school affiliated to the WBBSE, are located near KB Market on Topsia Road, Topsia.
