= Tiljala =

Neighbourhood in East Kolkata, West Bengal, India

- Neighbourhood in Kolkata (Calcutta)
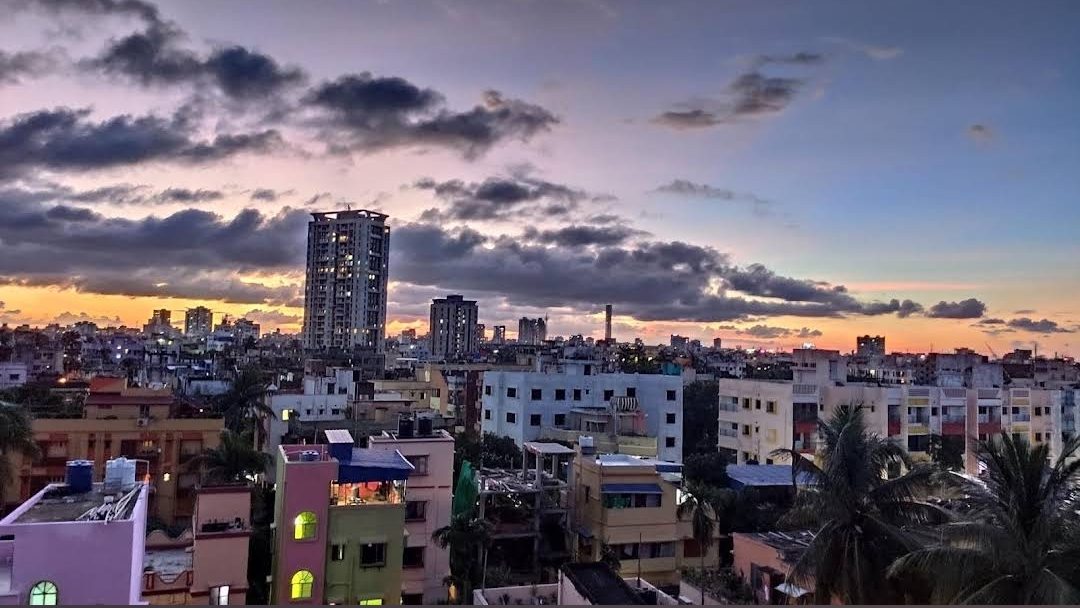
- Tiljala, Kolkata

- Location in Kolkata
- Coordinates: 22.527861°N 88.385564°E
- Country: India
- State: West Bengal
- City: Kolkata
- District: Kolkata
- Metro Station: Ritwik Ghatak (under construction); VIP Bazar (under construction)
- Municipal Corporation: Kolkata Municipal Corporation
- KMC wards: 65, 66, 67, 107
- Elevation: 36 ft (11 m)

Population
  - Total: For population see linked KMC ward pages
- Time zone: UTC+5:30 (IST)
- PIN: 700039
- Area code: +91 33
- Lok Sabha constituency: Kolkata Dakshin
- Vidhan Sabha constituency: Ballygunge and Kasba

Tiljala is a neighbourhood of East Kolkata, in West Bengal, India.

== History ==
The East India Company obtained from the Mughal emperor Farrukhsiyar, in 1717, the right to rent from 38 villages surrounding their settlement. Of these 5 lay across the Hooghly in what is now Howrah district. The remaining 33 villages were on the Calcutta side. After the fall of Siraj-ud-daulah, the last independent Nawab of Bengal, it purchased these villages in 1758 from Mir Jafar and reorganised them. These villages were known en-bloc as Dihi Panchannagram and Tiljala was one of them. It was considered to be a suburb beyond the limits of the Maratha Ditch.

In the eastern fringes of Kolkata, the neighbourhoods such as Tangra, Tiljala, Topsia and Dhapa, were populated largely with people who migrated from poverty-ridden and caste-ridden villages, in Bihar and Uttar Pradesh. They came with dreams of a better life but landed in the slums with open drains, pigsties, factory chimneys and pungent chemicals. They found work in the tanneries and factories and also engaged in menial work. A big proportion of them were Chamars, but there also were Doms, Dosads, Mehtars and Kahars. They were all Harijans and they formed a majority. They escaped from the petty persecution they faced in their villages but were far removed from the mainstream of urban life and culture. They have been here, living in depressing conditions, for more than a century.

Originally a slum area, Tiljala was once known for abject living conditions and high crime rates. It has seen a recent real estate boom but urbanization hasn't kept pace with settlements. Scattered pockets of slums exist, illegal constructions are on the rise and the arterial roads still lack pavements.

== Geography ==
=== Police district ===
Tiljala police station is one of the nine police stations in the South-east division of Kolkata Police. It is located at C.N. Roy Road, Kolkata-39.

Karaya Women police station, has jurisdiction over all police districts under the jurisdiction of the South-east division, i.e. Topsia, Beniapukur, Ballygunge, Gariahat, Lake, Karaya, Rabindra Sarobar and Tiljala.

Jadavpur, Thakurpukur, Behala, Purba Jadavpur, Tiljala, Regent Park, Metiabruz, Nadial and Kasba police stations were transferred from South 24 Parganas to Kolkata in 2011. Except Metiabruz, all the police stations were split into two. The new police stations are Parnasree, Haridevpur, Garfa, Patuli, Survey Park, Pragati Maidan, Bansdroni and Rajabagan.

=== Location ===
It is bordered by E.M. Bypass in the east, Ballygunge in the west, Kasba in the south and Topsia in the north.

=== Sub areas ===
- Picnic Garden
- Kustia
- Bondel
- Binoy Singh Colony
- Panchanna Gram
- Kata Pukur
- Bediadanga

== Demographics ==
It housed one of the largest slums, mainly Muslim, in the city. In 1971, Hindu refugees from Bangladesh settled in colonies. At present, Tiljala is a melting pot with great ethnic diversity—there are Bengalis, Marwaris, Punjabis, Anglo-Indians, Nepalis, a number of communities from Bihar and the North-East and a few African nationals.

== Education ==
There are several pre-schools and government aided higher secondary schools.

- Bijoynagar High School
- Tiljala Balika Vidyalaya
- Tiljala Brajanath Vidyapith
- Tiljala High School(Boys)

== Festivals ==
The Ras Purnima is celebrated with an elaborate fair and a circus show.

Sunil Nagar club won the prestigious Asian Paints Sharad Shamman "Best Durga Puja" award three times in 1992, 1995 and 1999.

== Transport ==
Buses ply along Picnic Garden Road and Chandra Nath Roy Road (C.N. Roy Road) in Tiljala.

=== Bus ===
==== Private Bus ====
- 39 Picnic Garden - Kolkata High Court
- 39A/2 VIP Bazar - Howrah Station
- 42A Kasba Gas Turbine (Panchannagram) - Bichalighat

==== Mini Bus ====
- S125 Kasba Gas Turbine (Panchannagram) - Dey's Medical - Howrah Station
- S128 Picnic Garden - Howrah Station

The auto-rickshaws running in three routes bring the important crossings of Ballygunge Phari, Gariahat and Park Circus within easy reach.

The construction of the Bondel Gate Rail Overbridge above the Kolkata Suburban Railway (Sealdah South Section), between Picnic Garden Road and Bondel Road, completed in 2006 after a long legal wrangle over land dispute, has eased up much of the traffic congestion. The proposed widening of Picnic Garden Road and G. S. Bose Road is yet to take place.

=== Train ===
Tiljala is served by the Sealdah South lines of the Kolkata Suburban Railway. Ballygunge Junction railway station and Park Circus railway station are 1.4 km and 1.8 km away from Colony Bazar respectively.
