= Picnic Garden =

- Neighbourhood in Kolkata (Calcutta)
- Interactive map of Picnic Garden
- Coordinates: 22°31′50″N 88°22′54″E
- Country: India
- State: West Bengal
- City: Kolkata
- District: Kolkata
- Metro Station: VIP Bazar
- Municipal Corporation: Kolkata Municipal Corporation
- KMC ward: 66
- Time zone: UTC+5:30 (IST)
- PIN: 700039
- Area code: +91 33
- Lok Sabha constituency: Kolkata Dakshin
- Vidhan Sabha constituency: Kasba

Picnic Garden is a neighbourhood of East Kolkata in the Indian state of West Bengal.

== Location ==
Technically Picnic Garden is a locality in the Tiljala area, extending between Bartala More and VIP Nagar. For all practical purposes and in popular parlance, Picnic Garden refers to the area east of the Bondel Gate, off Ballygunge Place.

== Transport ==
Buses ply along Picnic Garden Road and Chandra Nath Roy Road (C.N. Roy Road) in Picnic Garden.

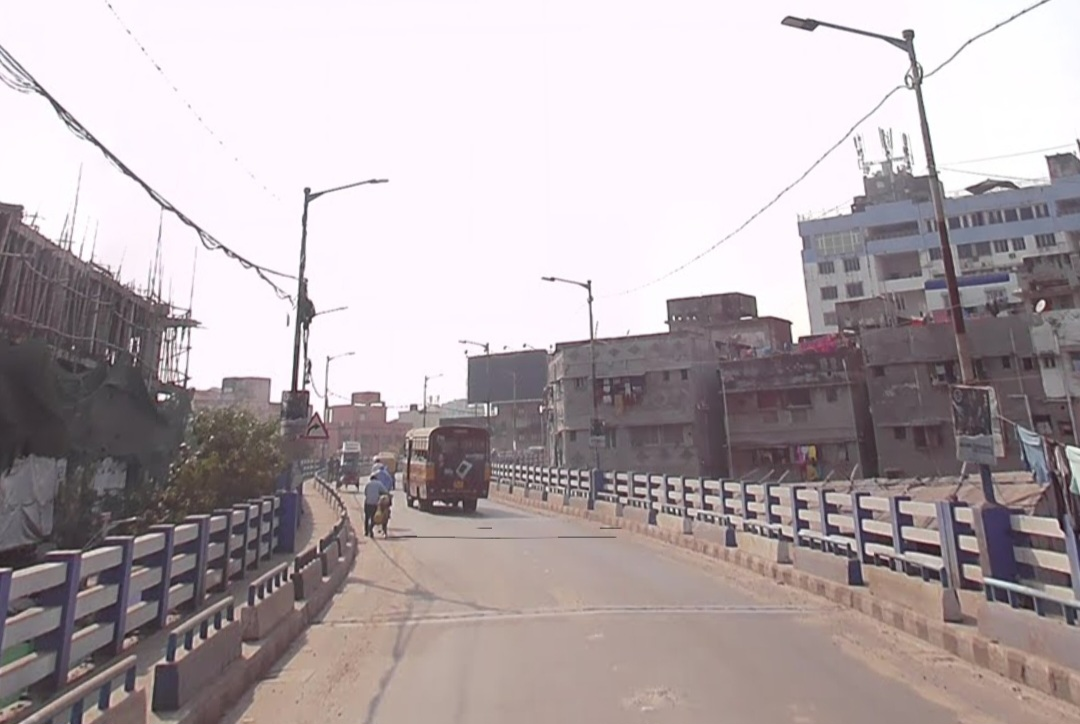
Bondel road railway over bridge

=== Bus ===
==== Private Bus ====
- 39 Picnic Garden - Kolkata High Court
- 39A/2 VIP Bazar - Howrah Station
- 42A Kasba Gas Turbine (Panchannagram) - Bichalighat

==== Mini Bus ====
- S125 Kasba Gas Turbine (Panchannagram) - Dey's Medical - Howrah Station
- S128 Picnic Garden - Howrah Station

The auto-rickshaws running in three routes bring the important crossings of Ballygunge Phari, Gariahat and Park Circus within easy reach.

The construction of the Bondel Gate Rail Overbridge above the Kolkata Suburban Railway (Sealdah South Section), between Picnic Garden Road and Bondel Road, completed in 2006 after a long legal wrangle over land dispute, has eased up much of the traffic congestion. The proposed widening of Picnic Garden Road and G. S. Bose Road is yet to take place.

=== Metro ===
The newly opened VIP Bazar Metro Station on the Orange Line upon being commissioned will serve the locality.

=== Train ===
Picnic Garden is served by the Sealdah South lines of the Kolkata Suburban Railway. Ballygunge Junction railway station and Park Circus railway station are 1.4 km and 1.8 km away from Colony Bazar respectively.

== Culture ==
The Ras Purnima is celebrated with an elaborate fair and a circus show.

Sunil Nagar club won the prestigious Asian Paints Sharad Shamman "Best Durga Puja" award three times in 1992, 1995 and 1999.
