= Barun Sengupta metro station =

Metro station in Kolkata, India

Barun Sengupta
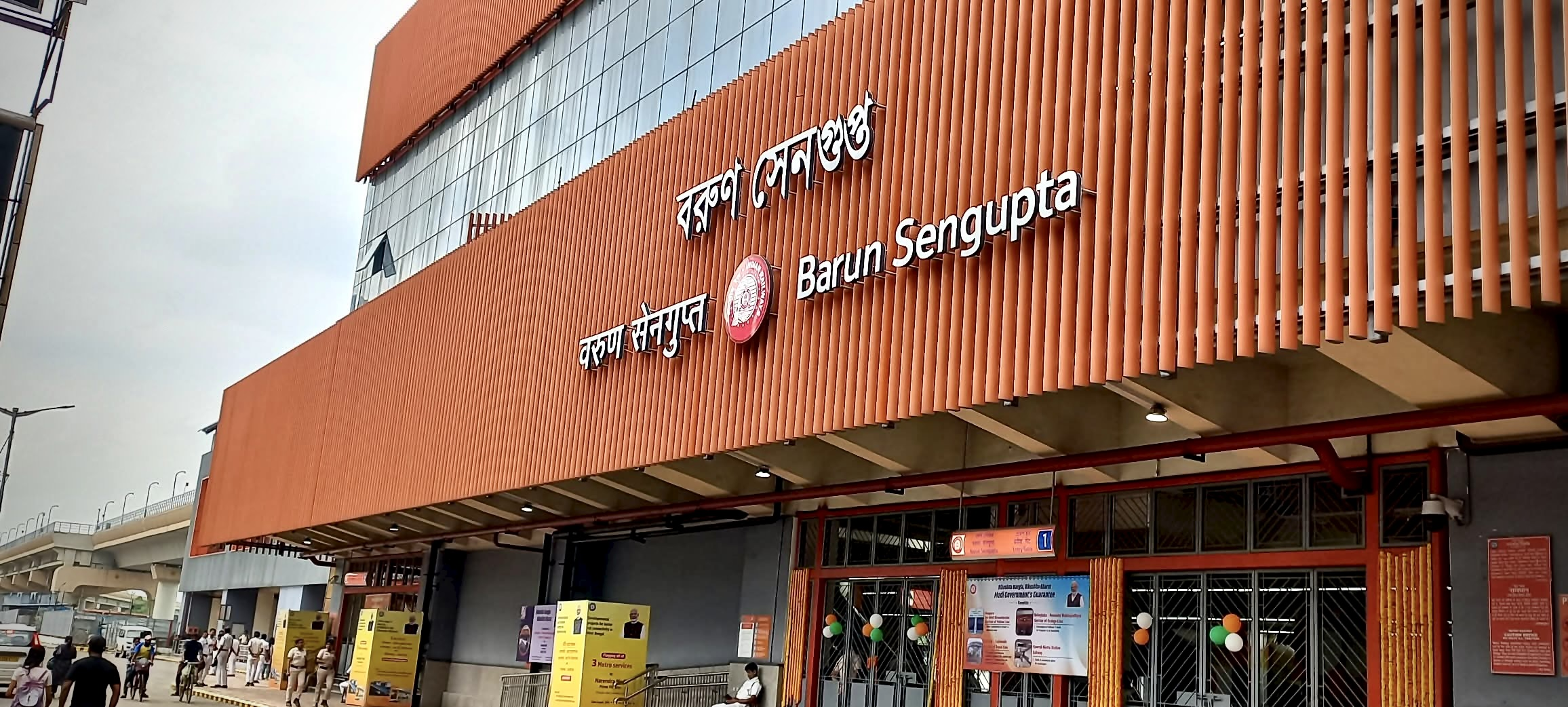

General information
- Other names: Science City
- Location: SH3, Dhapa; Kolkata, West Bengal 700105; India
- Coordinates: 22.54393°N 88.40015°E
- System: Kolkata Metro
- Operator: Metro Railway, Kolkata
- Line: Orange Line
- Platforms: 2 (2 side platforms)
- Tracks: 2

Construction
- Structure type: Elevated
- Parking: Yes

Other information
- Status: Operational
- Station code: KBST

History
- Opened: 22 August 2025; 11 months ago

Services
Preceding station	Kolkata Metro	Following station
Ritwik Ghatak towards Kavi Subhash	Orange Line	Beleghata Terminus
Route map
Location

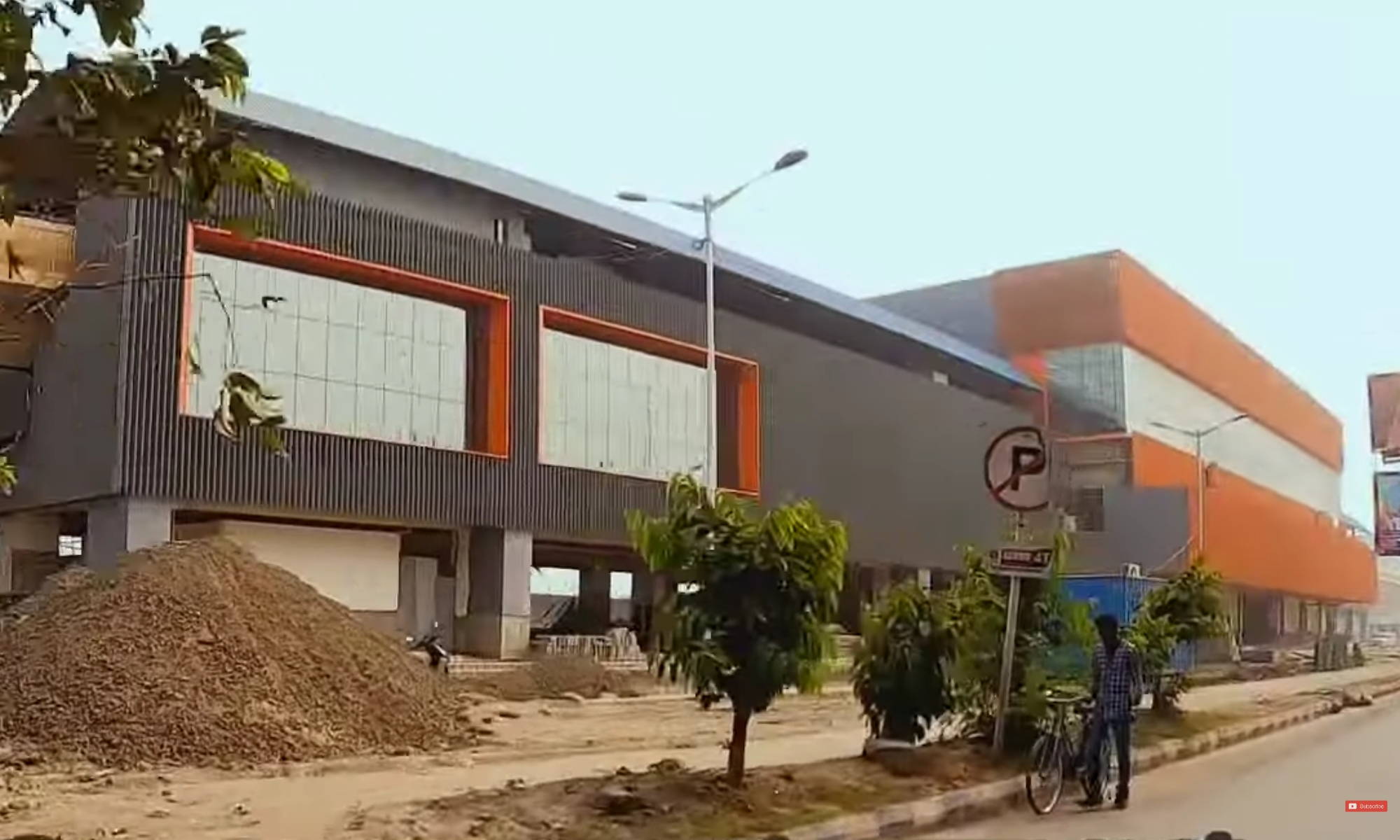
Barun Sengupta Metro Station

Barun Sengupta (also known as Science City), is a metro station of Orange Line of the Kolkata Metro located at Parama Island in the Dhapa area of Kolkata, West Bengal, India, serving Dhapa, ITC Royal Bengal, JW Marriott and Science City areas. The station is named in honour of the founder of Bartaman, Barun Sengupta. The station is elevated above the Eastern Metropolitan Bypass.

== Location ==
This station is located in Dhapa across the service road and footpath on the eastern side of Biswa Bangla Sarani at Parama Island. The main elevated structure of the station is situated along the service road and footpath adjacent to the New Garia-bound lane of Biswa Bangla Sarani near Maa Flyover. It is geographically located at 22.543986°N 88.399274°E. The previous station of the station is Ritwik Ghatak metro station at a distance of 1.4 km (0.87 mi) and the next station is Beleghata metro station at a distance of 0.9 km (0.56 mi).

== History ==
This project was sanctioned in the budget of 2010–11 by Mamata Banerjee with a project deadline of six years. The execution of this project has been entrusted to RVNL at a cost of Rs 3951.98 crore. It will help to reduce travel time between the southern fringes of Kolkata to Netaji Subhas Chandra Bose International Airport. In October 2011, RVNL awarded Gammon India Limited, the tender for the construction of the metro corridor from VIP Bazar Metro Station to Nikko Park (Nalban metro station), including stations, as part of Package-II of Orange Line. Amongst those metro stations, one in Dhapa was also sanctioned, i.e., Barun Sengupta. In January 2012, the construction of the metro station along with the metro line started. The construction of the station was stopped in 2015 due to land dispute at Tagore Park culvert and a pair of footover bridges. The construction of the station started again in May 2017 and was fully completed in early 2023. But the metro couldn't be started due to a viaduct gap over Tagore Park culvert.

A week later after inauguration and a day after commercial run started on Kavi Subhash-Hemanta Mukhopadhyay section, in March 2024, RVNL announced the completion of that 76 m viaduct gap after construction of a single-span hanging steel bridge over the disputed Tagore Park culvert. This completed the viaduct upto Beleghata metro station, clearing the way for commercial operations at Barun Sengupta. Trial runs have started in the same month. The station was opened on 22 August 2025 as a part of Hemanta Mukhopadhyay–Beleghata Orange Line extension.

== Station ==
=== Structure ===
Barun Sengupta Metro Station is an elevated metro station and has a total of 4 levels. Station entrances and exits begin or end at the first level or ground level. Second-level or L1 or intermediate level houses station fare control, station agents, metro vending machines, crossovers, etc. The third level or L2 or the final level houses the platforms and rail tracks. The fourth level or L3 contains shopping complex and eateries. The station is 200 meters long and 25 meters wide.

The station has four entrances and exits. The station is being built with state-of-the-art technology. In addition to staircases, it will be equipped with lifts and escalators. The station also has drinking water and toilet facilities.

=== Layout ===
L3	Commercial Podium	Shopping complex, eateries
L2	Side platform, Doors will open on the left
L2	Platform 1	Train towards Beleghata (terminus) →
L2	Platform 2	← Train towards Kavi Subhash (Ritwik Ghatak)
L2	Side platform, Doors will open on the left
L1	Concourse	Fare control, station agent, Metro QR ticket vending machines, crossover
G	Street level	Exit/Entrance

== Power and signal systems ==
Like other stations and lines of Kolkata Metro, this station has 750 volt DC powered third rail. The electricity system will be used to operate the train.

Train movement at this station will be managed by communication based train control signaling system. With this signal system, trains can be operated at intervals of 90 seconds.

== See also ==
- List of Kolkata Metro stations
