= VIP Bazar metro station =

Transit station in Kolkata, India

VIP Bazar
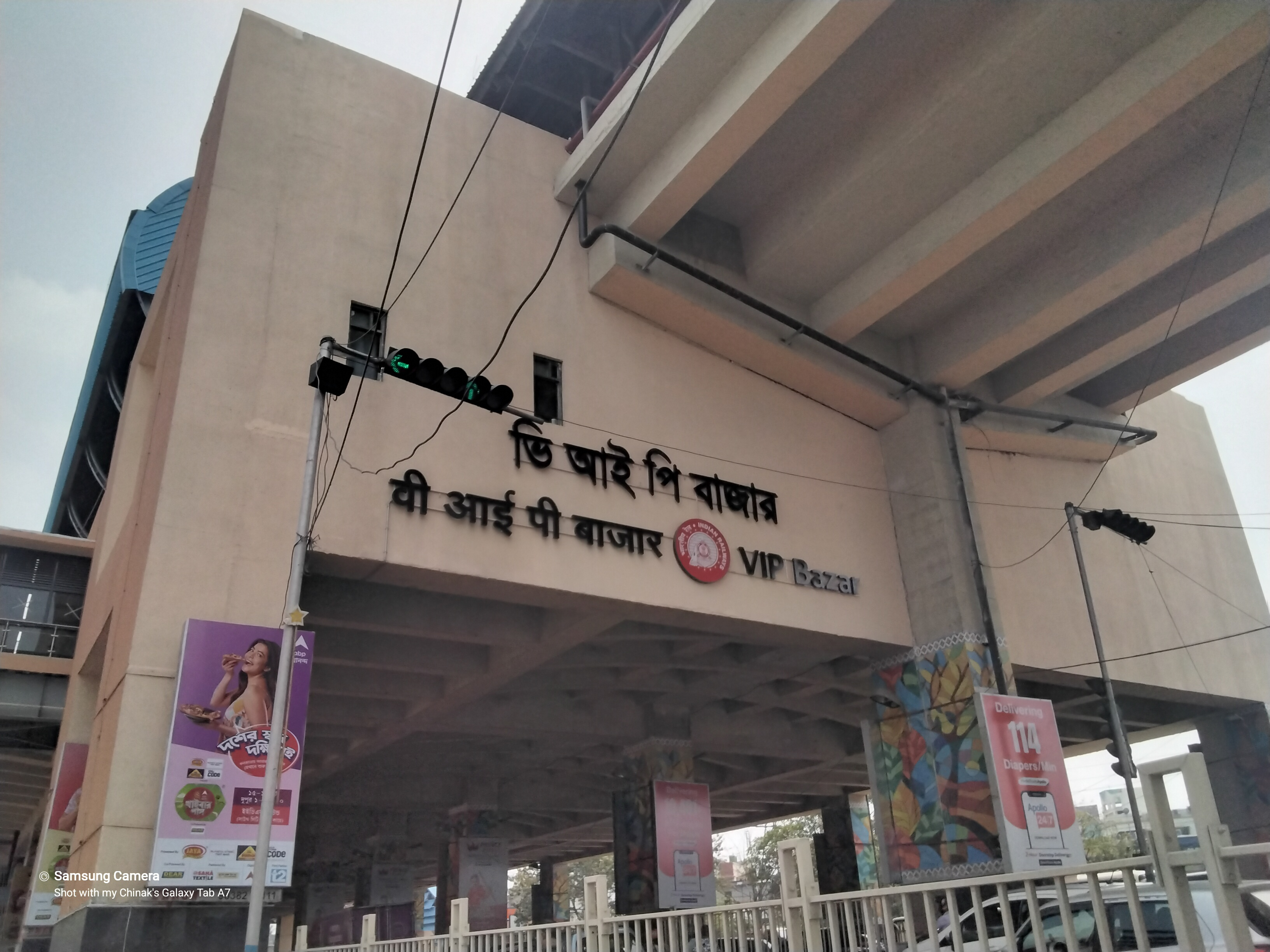
- VIP Bazaar metro station

General information
- Location: VIP Bazar, EM Bypass; Kolkata, West Bengal 700039; India
- Coordinates: 22.525500°N 88.395860°E
- System: Kolkata Metro
- Operator: Metro Railway, Kolkata
- Line: Orange Line
- Platforms: 2 (2 side platforms)
- Tracks: 2

Construction
- Structure type: Elevated
- Accessible: Yes

Other information
- Status: Operational
- Station code: KVIB

History
- Opened: 22 August 2025; 12 months ago

Services
Preceding station	Kolkata Metro	Following station
Hemanta Mukhopadhyay towards Kavi Subhash	Orange Line	Ritwik Ghatak towards Beleghata
Route map
Location

VIP Bazar is a metro station of Orange Line of the Kolkata Metro located in the Tagore Park area of Kolkata, West Bengal, India, serving Tiljala and VIP Nagar areas. The station is named after the nearby market called, VIP Bazar. The station is elevated above the Eastern Metropolitan Bypass. VIP Nagar and VIP Bazar are located next to the station.

== Location ==
This station is located in VIP Bazar area. The geographical location of the station is 22.525500°N 88.395860°E. The previous station of the station is Hemanta Mukhopadhyay metro station at a distance of 1.3 km (0.81 mi) and the next station is Ritwik Ghatak metro station at a distance of 0.9 km (0.56 mi).

== History ==
This project was sanctioned in the budget of 2010–11 by Mamata Banerjee with a project deadline of six years. The execution of this project has been entrusted to RVNL at a cost of Rs 3951.98 crore. It will help to reduce travel time between the southern fringes of Kolkata to Netaji Subhas Chandra Bose International Airport. In October 2011, an initial tender was awarded for the construction of the Metro Corridor from Kavi Subhash metro station to VIP Bazar metro station. In January 2012, the construction of the metro station along with the metro line started. The construction of the station was stopped in 2015 due to land dispute at Tagore Park culvert and a pair of footover bridges. The construction of the station started again in May 2017.

A week later after inauguration and a day after commercial run started on Kavi Subhash-Hemanta Mukhopadhyay section, in March 2024, RVNL announced the completion of a 76 m (249 ft) viaduct gap after construction of a single-span open-web girder steel bridge over the disputed Tagore Park culvert. This completed the viaduct upto Beleghata metro station. As of March 2024, the station is fully completed. Trial runs have started in the same month. The station was opened on 22 August 2025 as a part of Hemanta Mukhopadhyay–Beleghata Orange Line extension.

== Station ==
=== Structure ===
VIP Bazar Metro Station is an elevated metro station and has total 3 levels. Station entrances and exits begin or end at the first level or ground level. Second level or L1 or intermediate level houses station fare control, station agents, metro vending machines, crossovers etc. The third level or L2 or the final level houses the platforms and rail tracks. The station is 200 meters long and 25 meters wide.

The station has four entrances and exits. The station is being built with state-of-the-art technology. In addition to staircases, it will be equipped with lifts and escalators. The station also has drinking water and toilet facilities.

=== Layout ===
L2	Side platform, Doors will open on the left
L2	Platform 2	Train towards Beleghata (Ritwik Ghatak) →
L2	Platform 1	← Train towards Kavi Subhash (Hemanta Mukhopadhyay)
L2	Side platform, Doors will open on the left
L1	Concourse	Fare control, station agent, Metro QR ticket vending machines, crossover
G	Street level	Exit/Entrance

== Power and signal systems ==
Like other stations and lines of Kolkata Metro, this station has 750 volt DC powered third rail. The electricity system will be used to operate the train.

Train movement at this station will be managed by communication based train control signaling system. With this signal system, trains can be operated at intervals of 90 seconds.

== Gallery ==
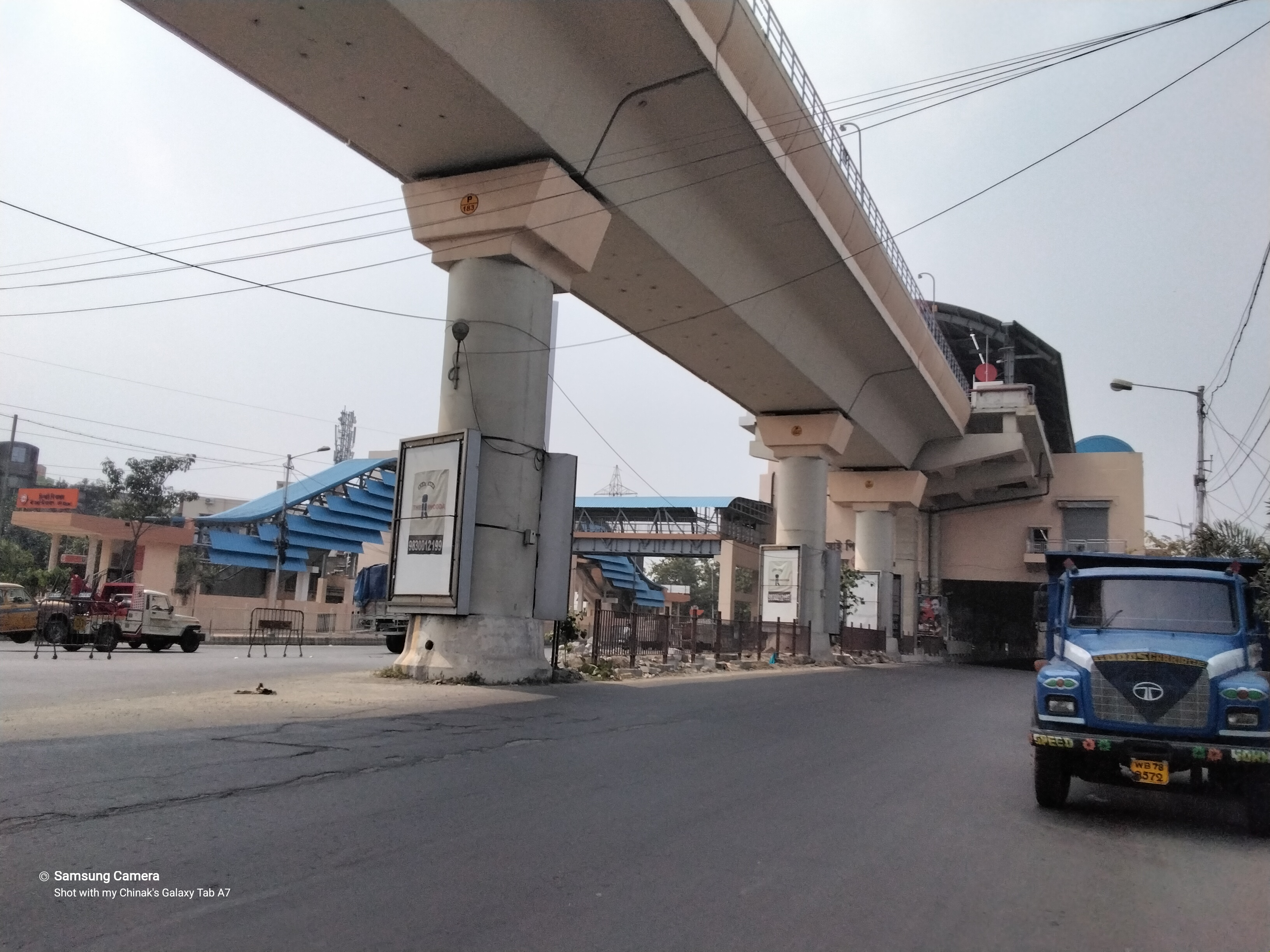
Metro Station

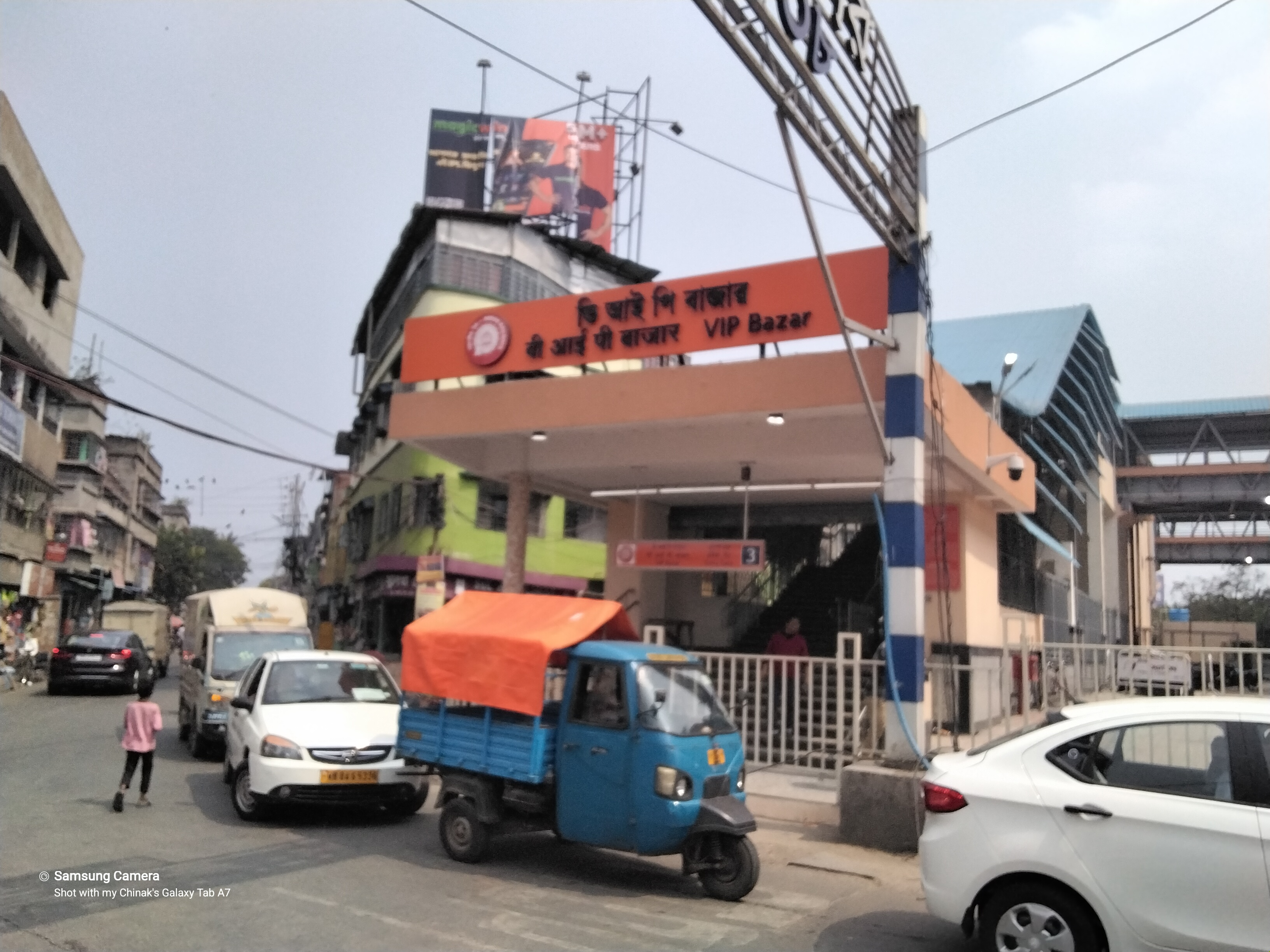
Station Entrance

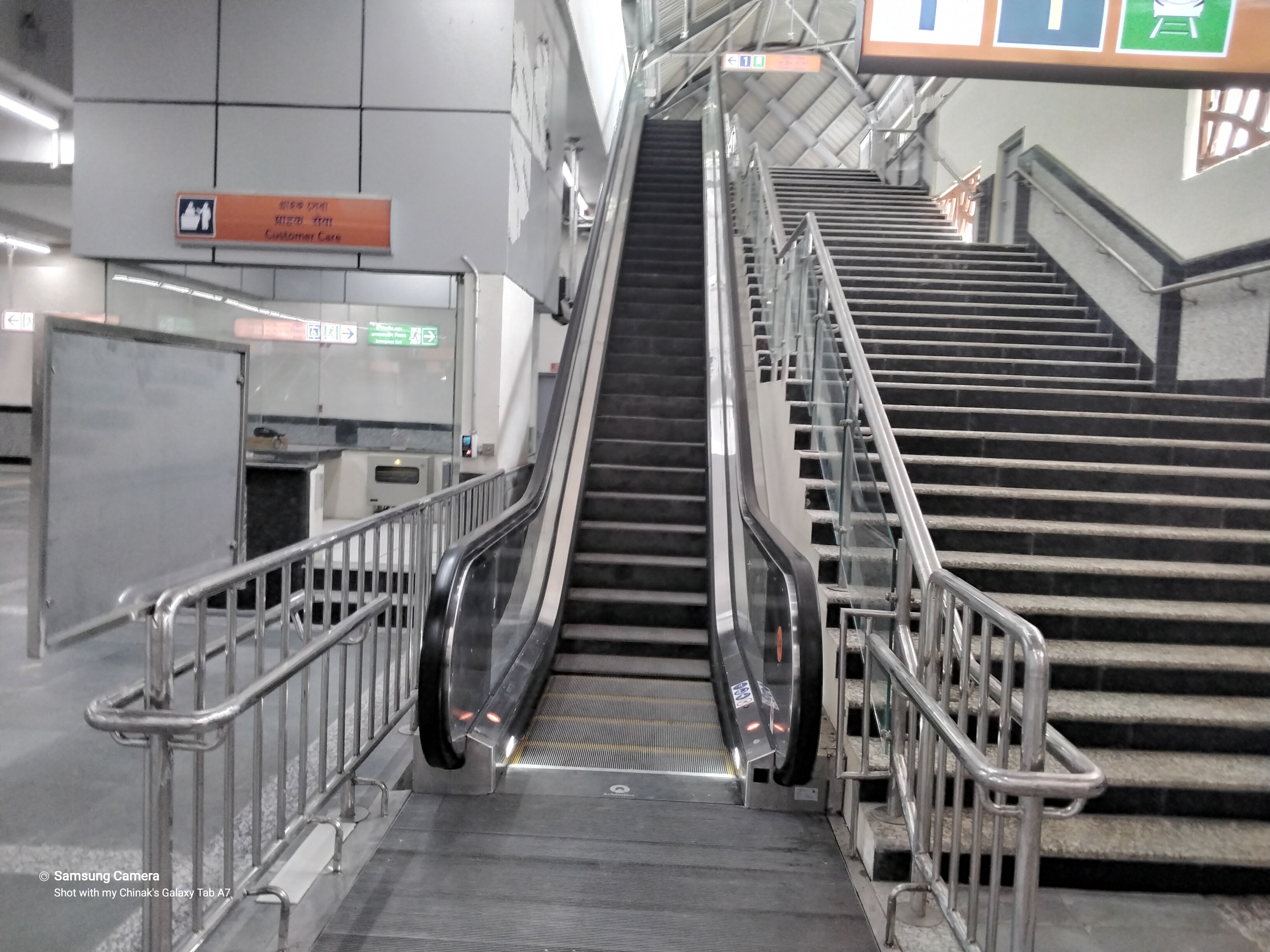
Escalators from Concourse area

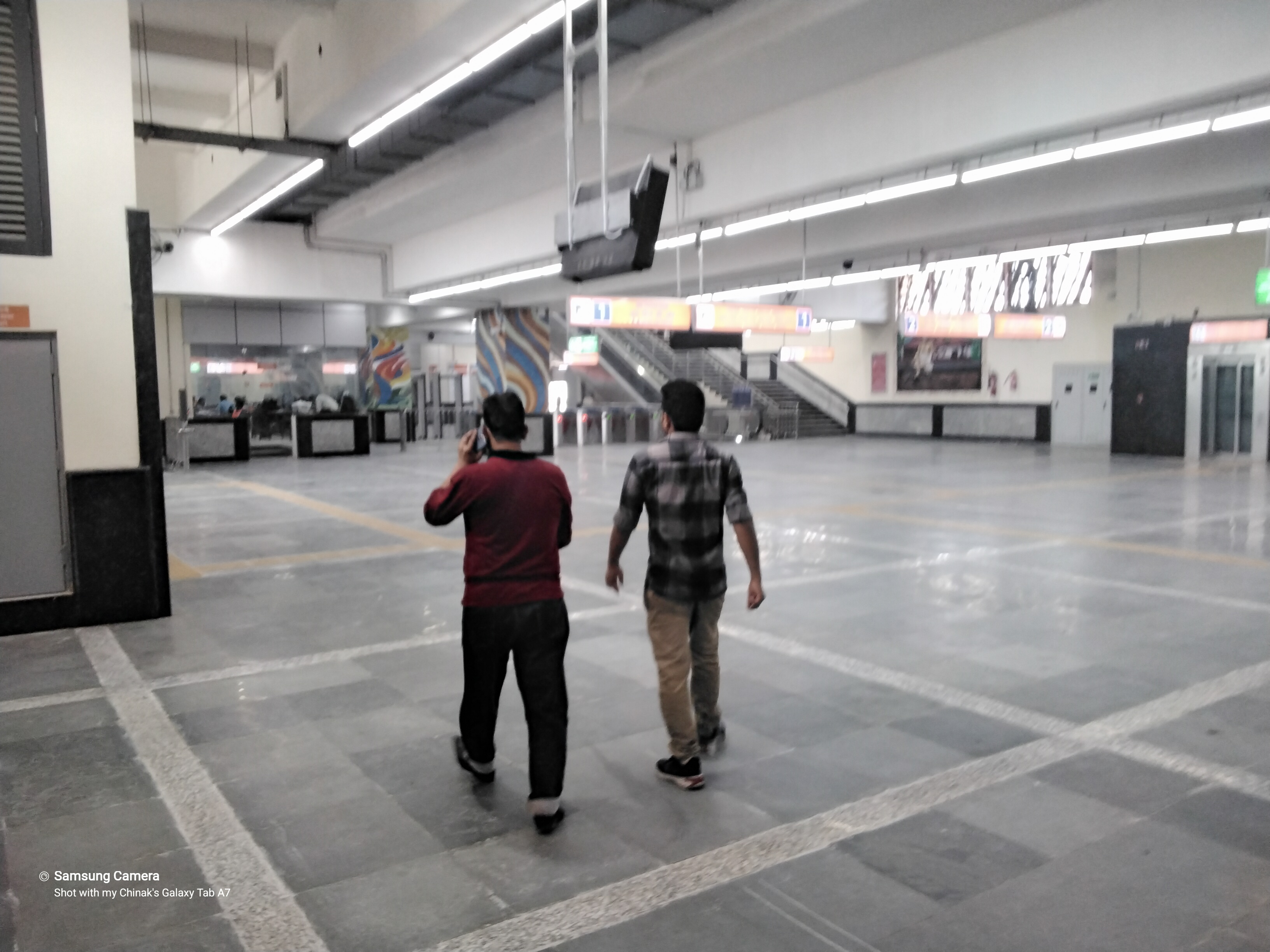
Concourse Area

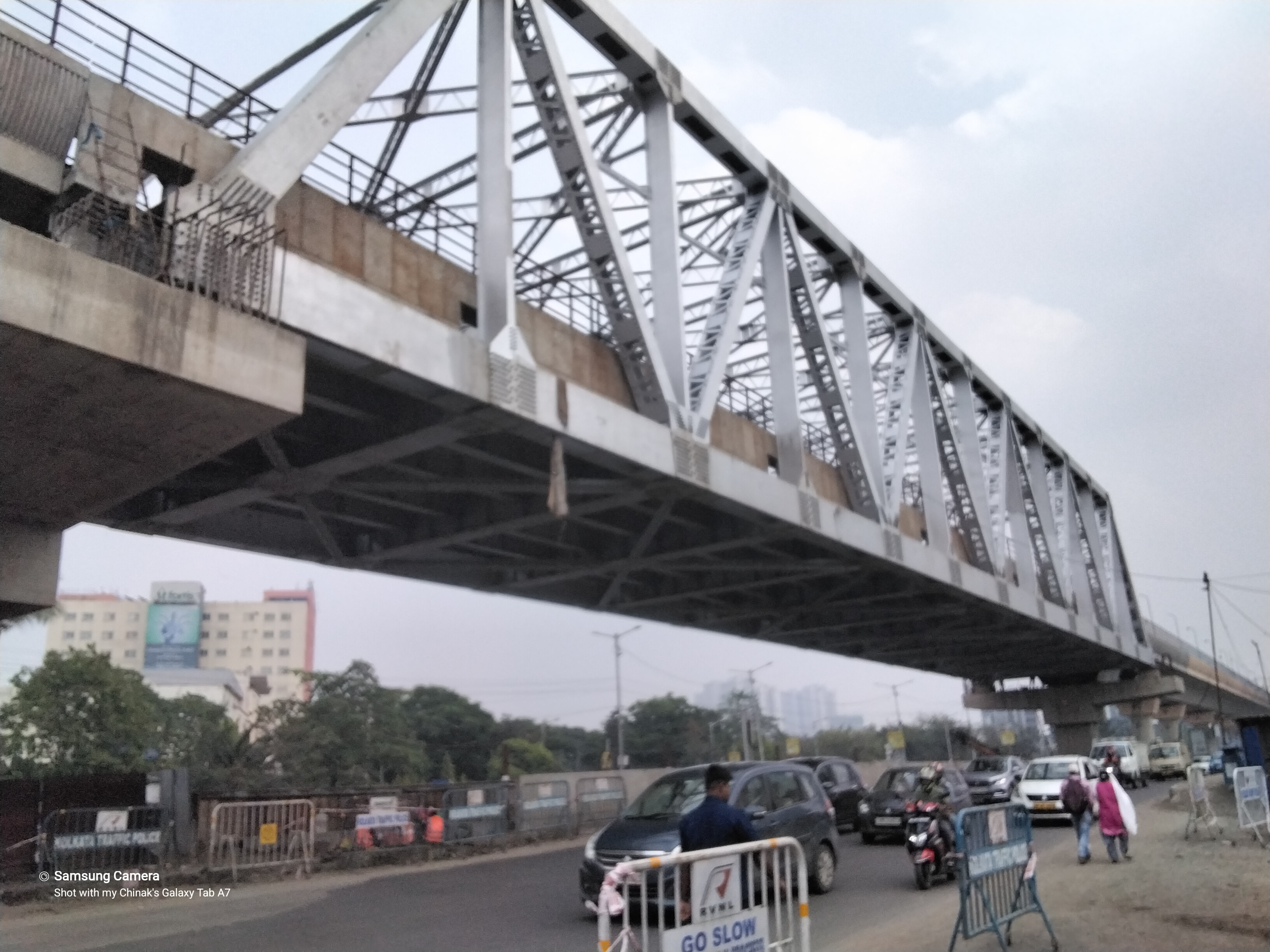
Box Bridge Between VIP Bazar and Hemanta Mukhopadhyay

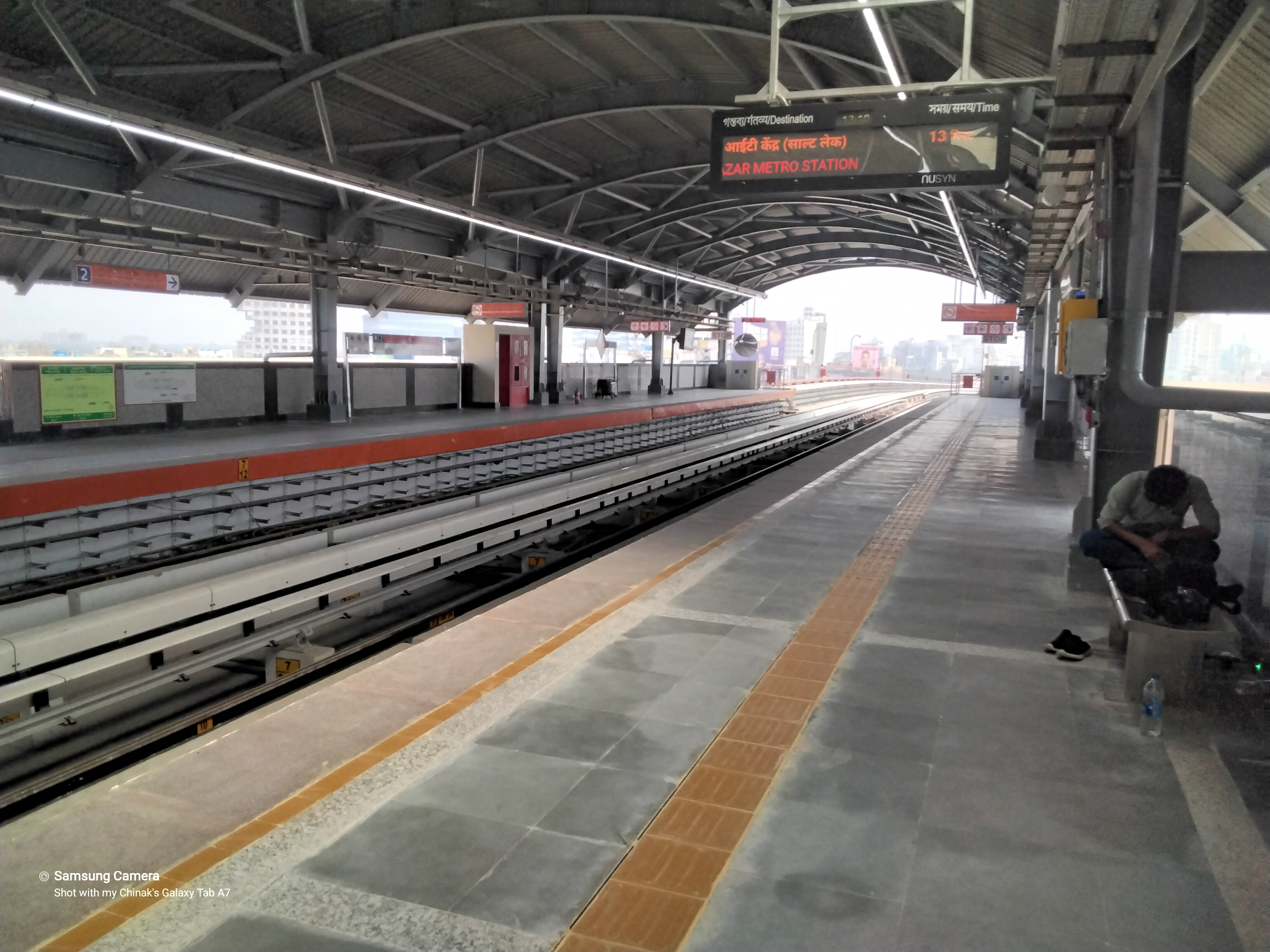
Station Platform

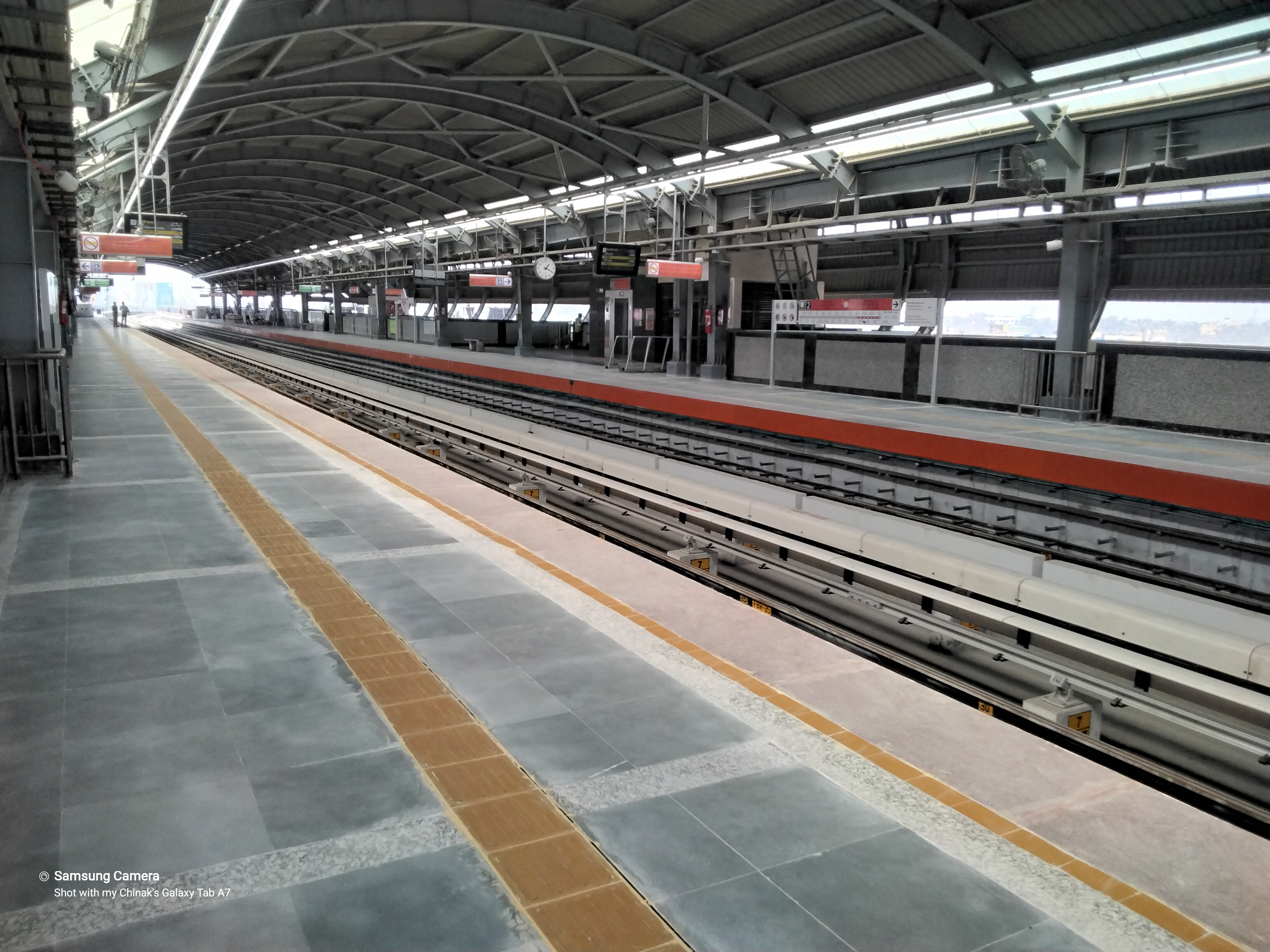
Station Platform

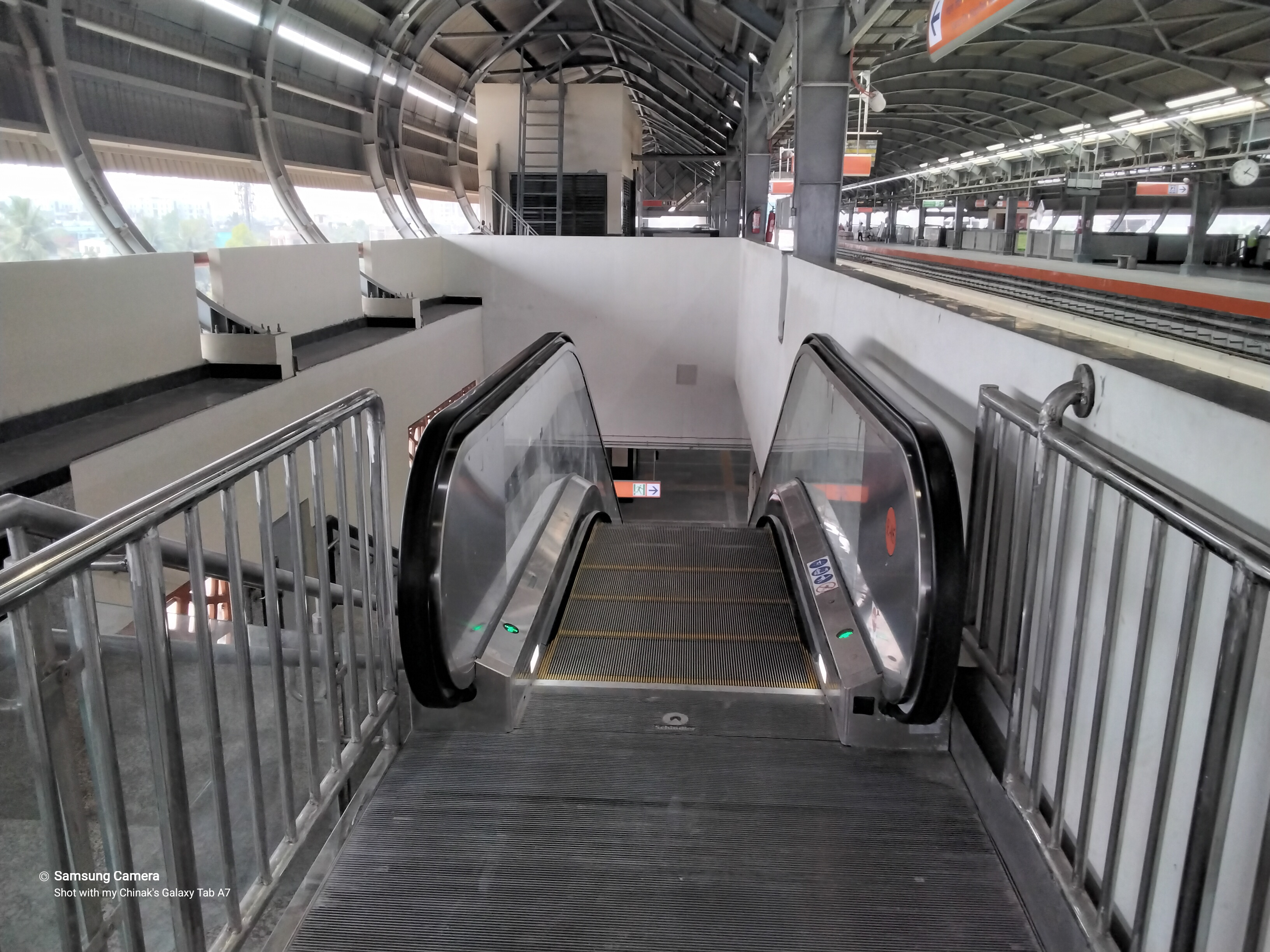
Escalators from Platform

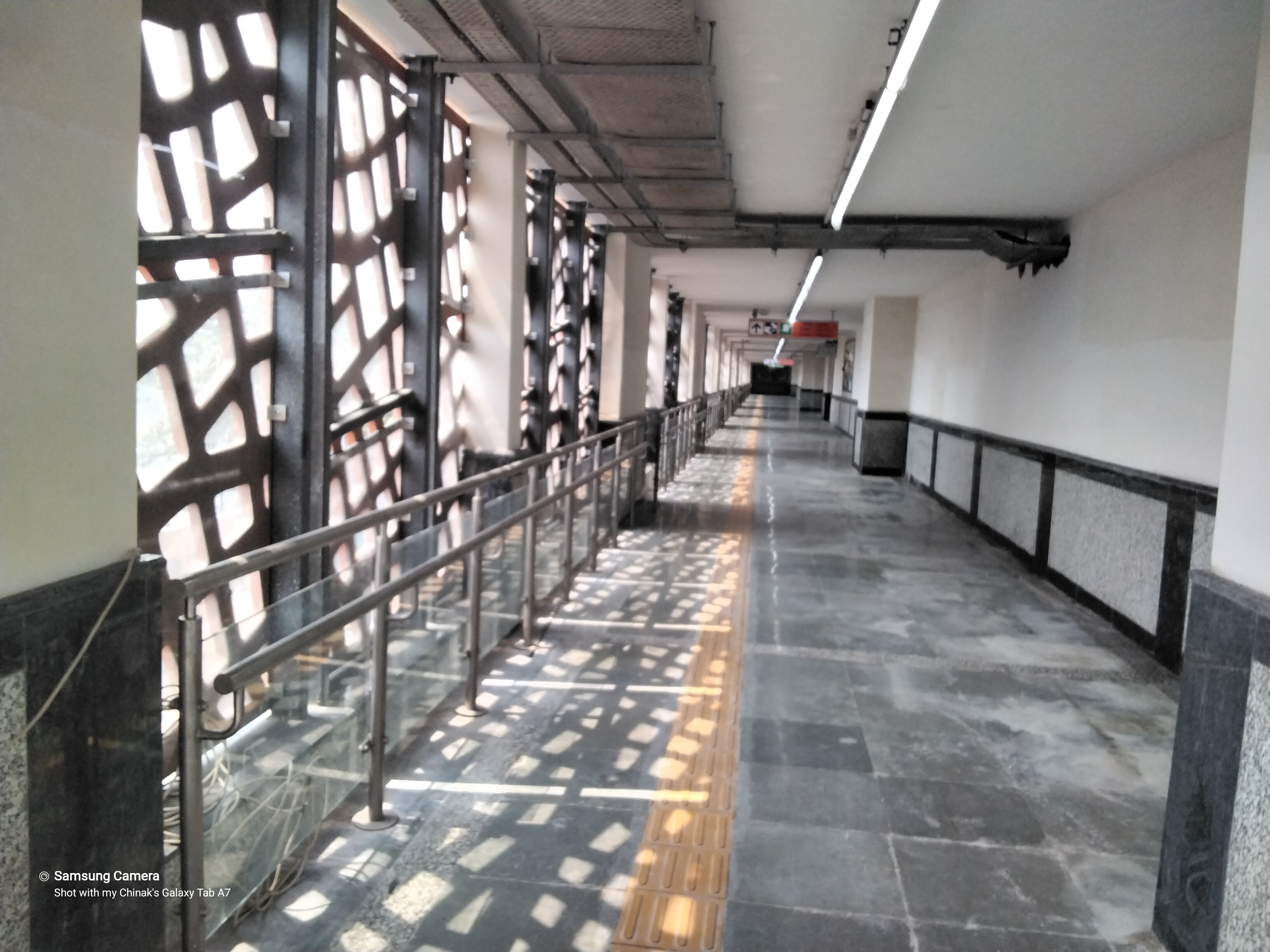
COncourse Area Corridor

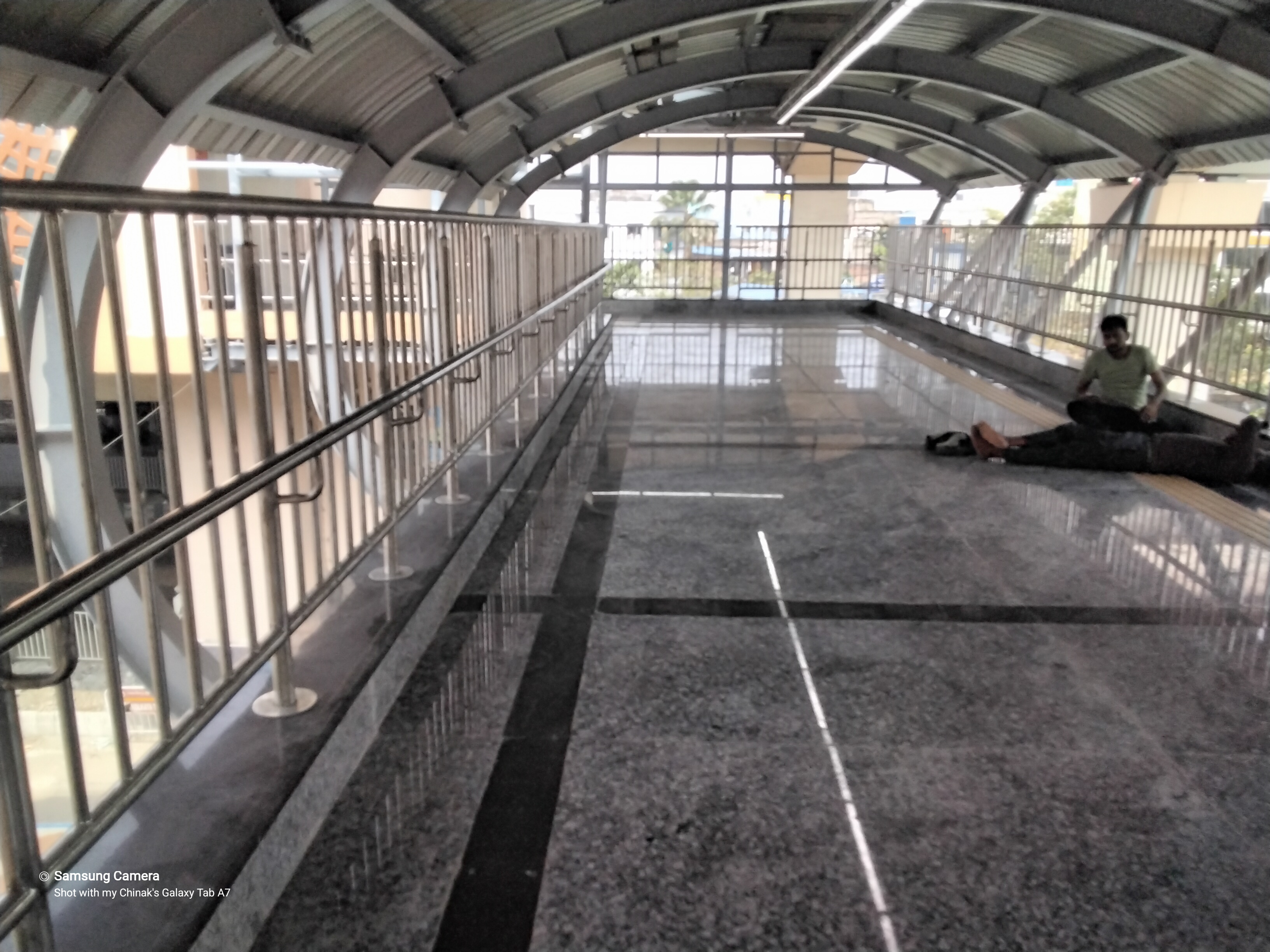
Foot Over Bridge

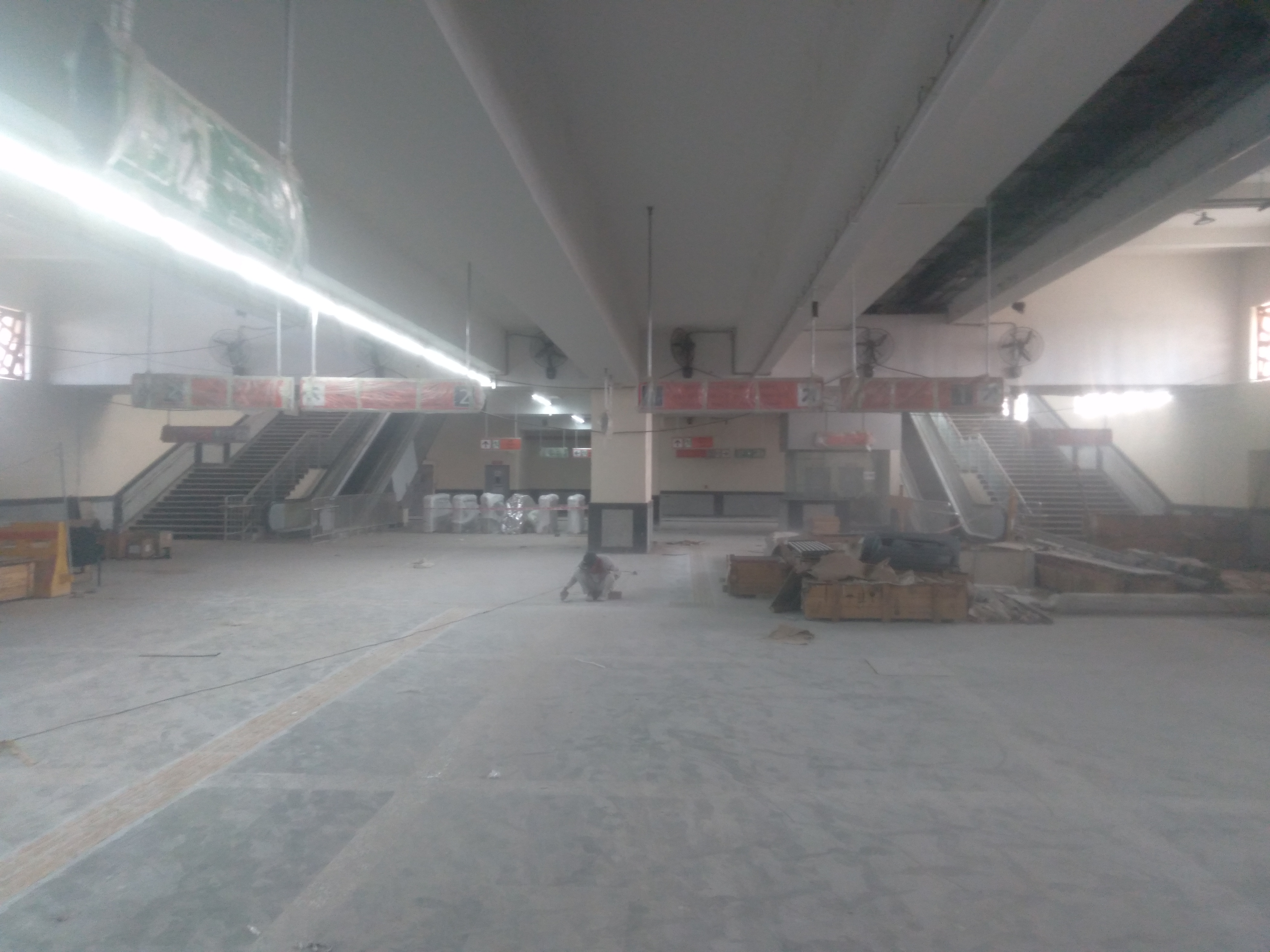
Ticket Counters

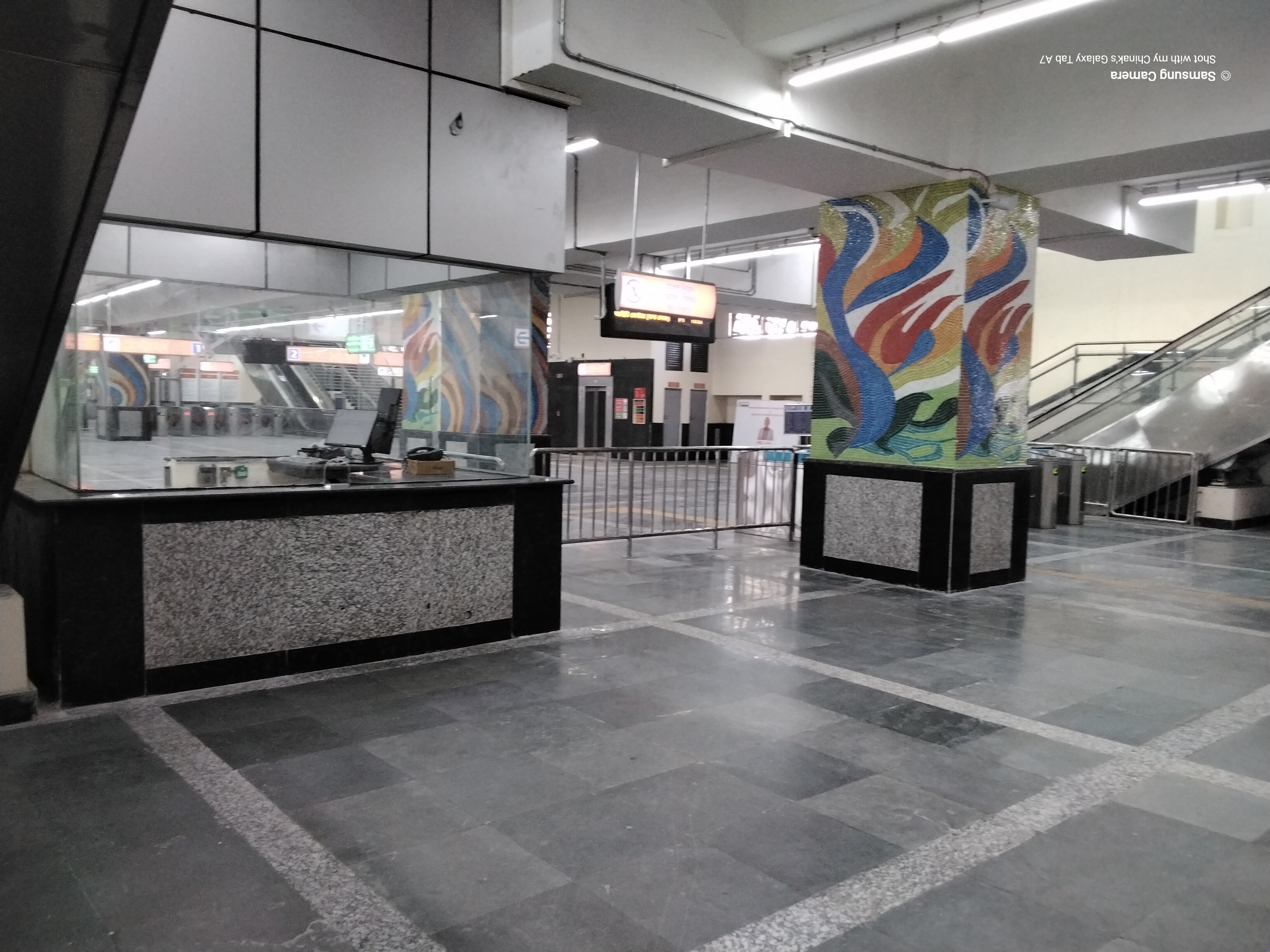
Station Control Room

== See also ==
- List of Kolkata Metro stations
