= Hemanta Mukhopadhyay metro station =

Metro station in Kolkata, India

Hemanta Mukhopadhyay
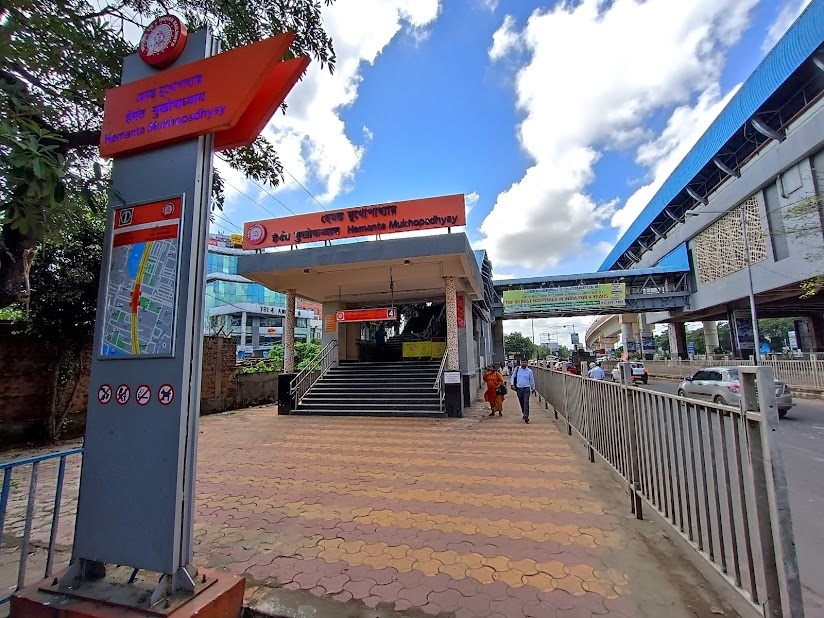
- Hemanta Mukhopadhyay Metro Station

General information
- Location: Ruby × Desun crossing Kolkata, West Bengal 700107; India
- Coordinates: 22.514777°N 88.401469°E
- System: Kolkata Metro
- Operator: Metro Railway, Kolkata
- Line: Orange Line
- Platforms: 2 side platforms
- Tracks: 2

Construction
- Structure type: Elevated
- Accessible: Yes

Other information
- Station code: KHMD

History
- Opened: 6 March 2024; 2 years ago
- Former names: Ruby More

Services
| Preceding station | Kolkata Metro | Following station |
|---|---|---|
| Kavi Sukanta towards Kavi Subhash | Orange Line | VIP Bazar towards Beleghata |
Route map
Location

Hemanta Mukhopadhyay is a metro station of the Orange Line of the Kolkata Metro at Ruby Crossing, serving the areas of E.M. Bypass, Kasba and Anandapur. The station is named in honour of the Indian Bengali playback singer, music director and producer Hemanta Mukhopadhyay.

== History ==
This project was sanctioned in the budget of 2010–11 by Mamata Banerjee with a project deadline of six years. The execution of this project was entrusted to RVNL at a cost of Rs 3951.98 crore. It was intended to reduce travel time between Kolkata's southernmost areas and the Netaji Subhas Chandra Bose International Airport.

The 5 km (3.1 mi) stretch from New Garia to Ruby Hospital was expected to start from 2018. Before then, the station and associated metro viaduct connections were completed, with trail runs being conducted over this and other phase 1 stations. RVNL planned to launch the metro over this truncated route before this year's Durga Puja, but this was postponed due to signalling issues.

After many hardships and developmental work, the Kavi Subhash–Hemanta Mukhopadhyay of Orange Line was inaugurated on 7 March 2024. The line was extended on 22 August 2025 to Beleghata.

== Structure and layout ==
The station is 200 meters long and 25 meters wide, is structurally elevated and has three levels. Station entrances and exits are at the ground level (G). The second level (L1) houses station fare control, station agents, metro card vending machines, and crossovers. The third level (L2) houses the platforms and rail tracks.

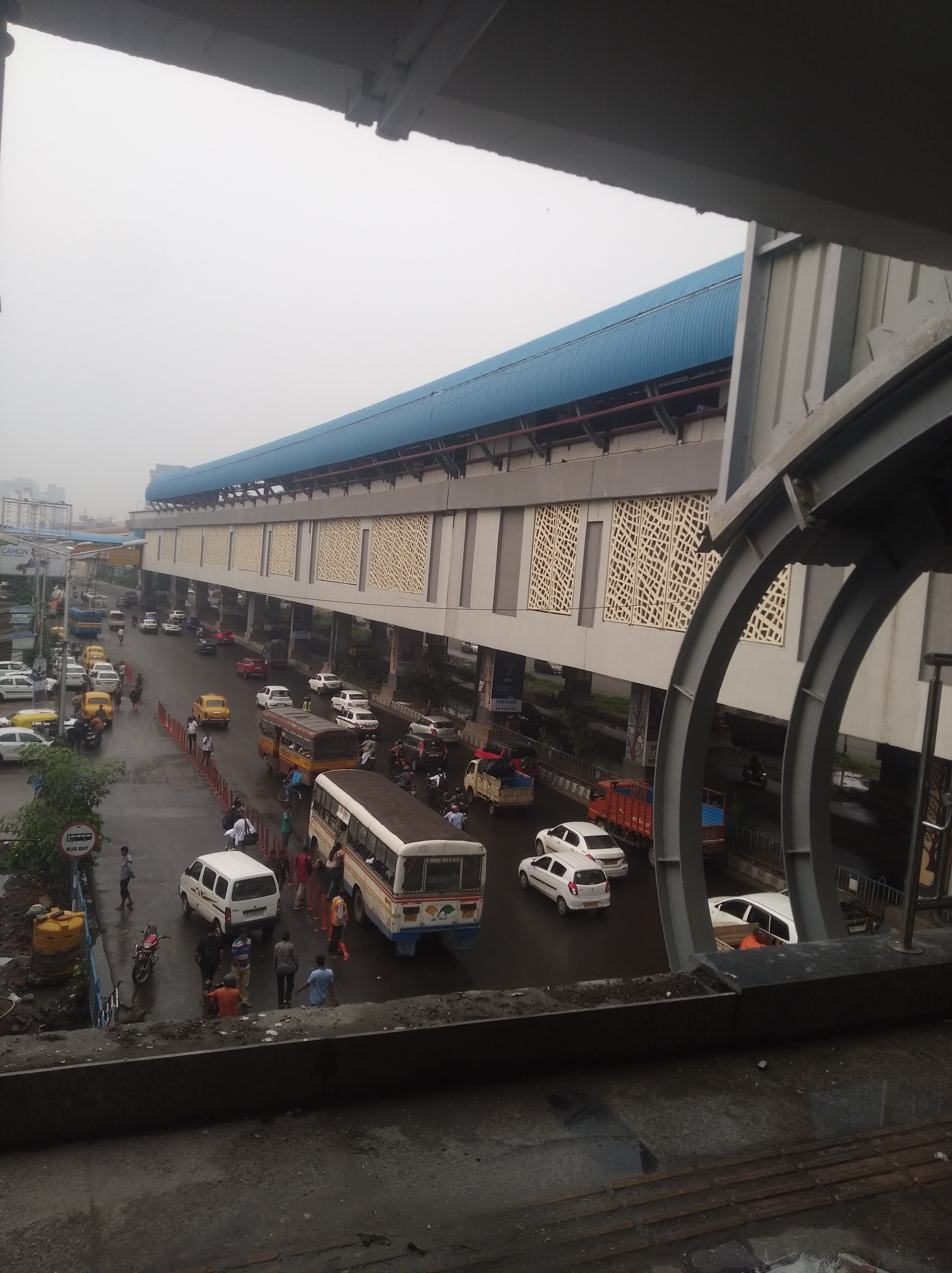
Hemanta Mukhopadhyay metro station

The station has four entrances and exits. In addition to staircases, it will be equipped with lifts and escalators. The station will have drinking water and toilet facilities.

| L2 | Side platform, Doors will open on the left |
| L2 | Platform 2 | Train towards Beleghata (VIP Bazar) → |
| L2 | Platform 1 | ← Train towards Kavi Subhash (Kavi Sukanta) |
| L2 | Side platform, Doors will open on the left |
| L1 | Concourse | Fare control, station agent, Metro QR ticket vending machines, crossover |
| G | Street level | Exit/Entrance |

== Connections ==
Hemanta Mukhopadhyay station is situated at the junction of Rashbehari Avenue and E.M. Bypass, termed as Ruby Crossing. It will act as an interchange for the residents of Central and South Kolkata, connecting them to the IT hubs of Salt Lake. People can reach Kasba Industrial Estate, passport offices and various school and colleges via the Orange and Blue Lines. The metro station is located in vicinity of various hospitals like Peerless Hospital. It is preceded by the VIP Bazar metro station 1.3 km to the north, and followed by the Kavi Sukanta metro station 1 km to the south.

== Gallery ==
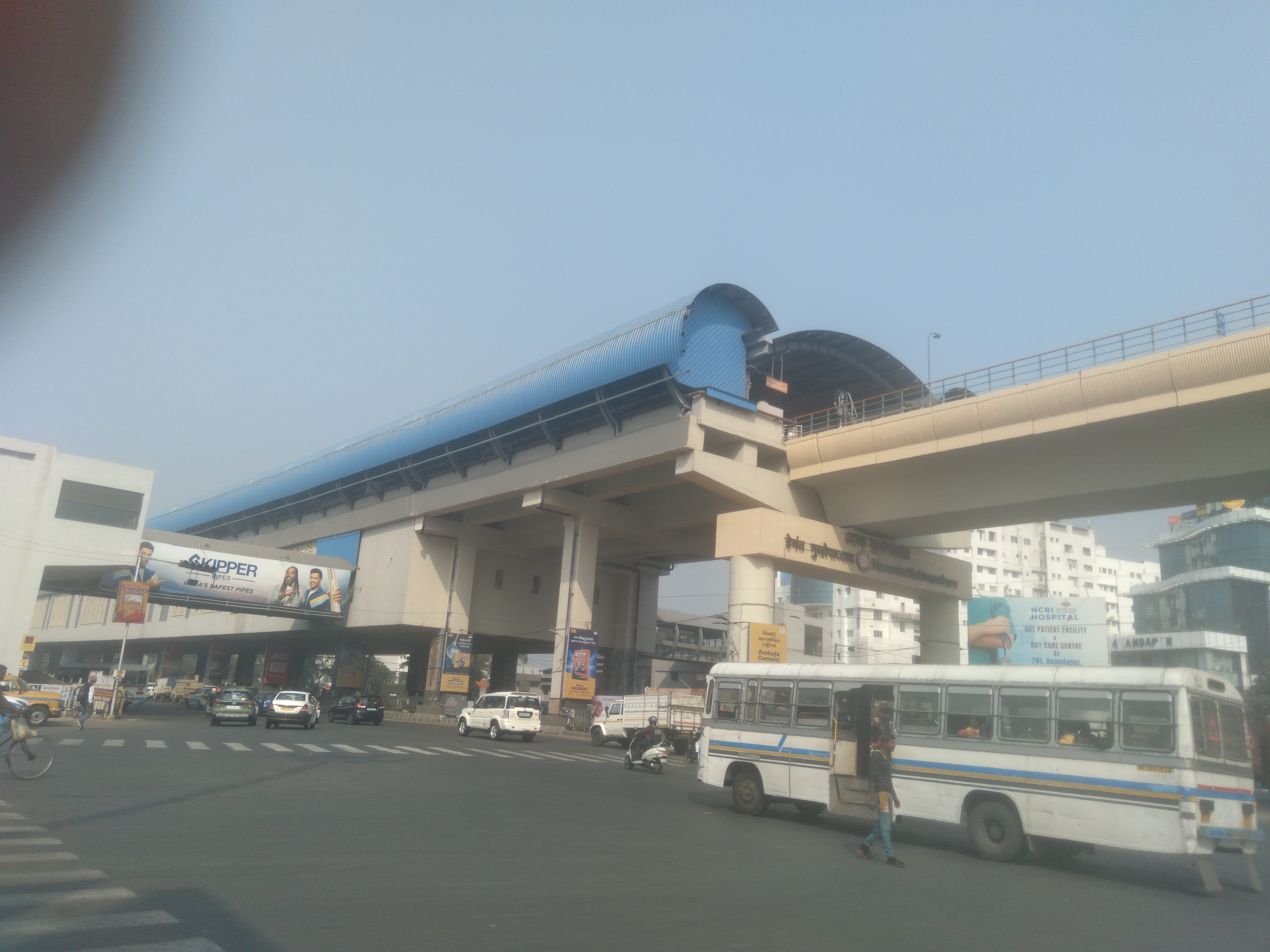
Ruby Crossing

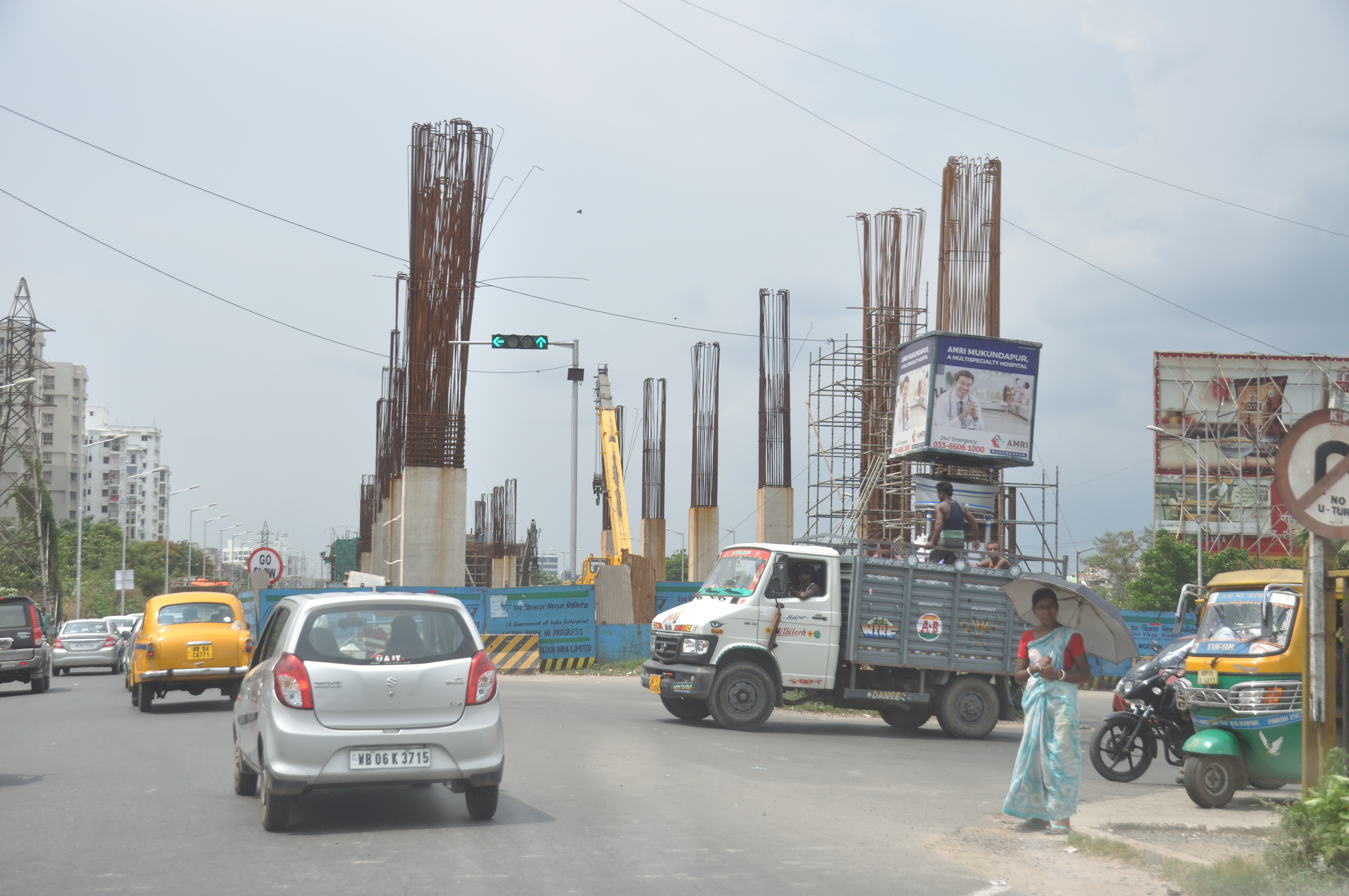
Construction phase

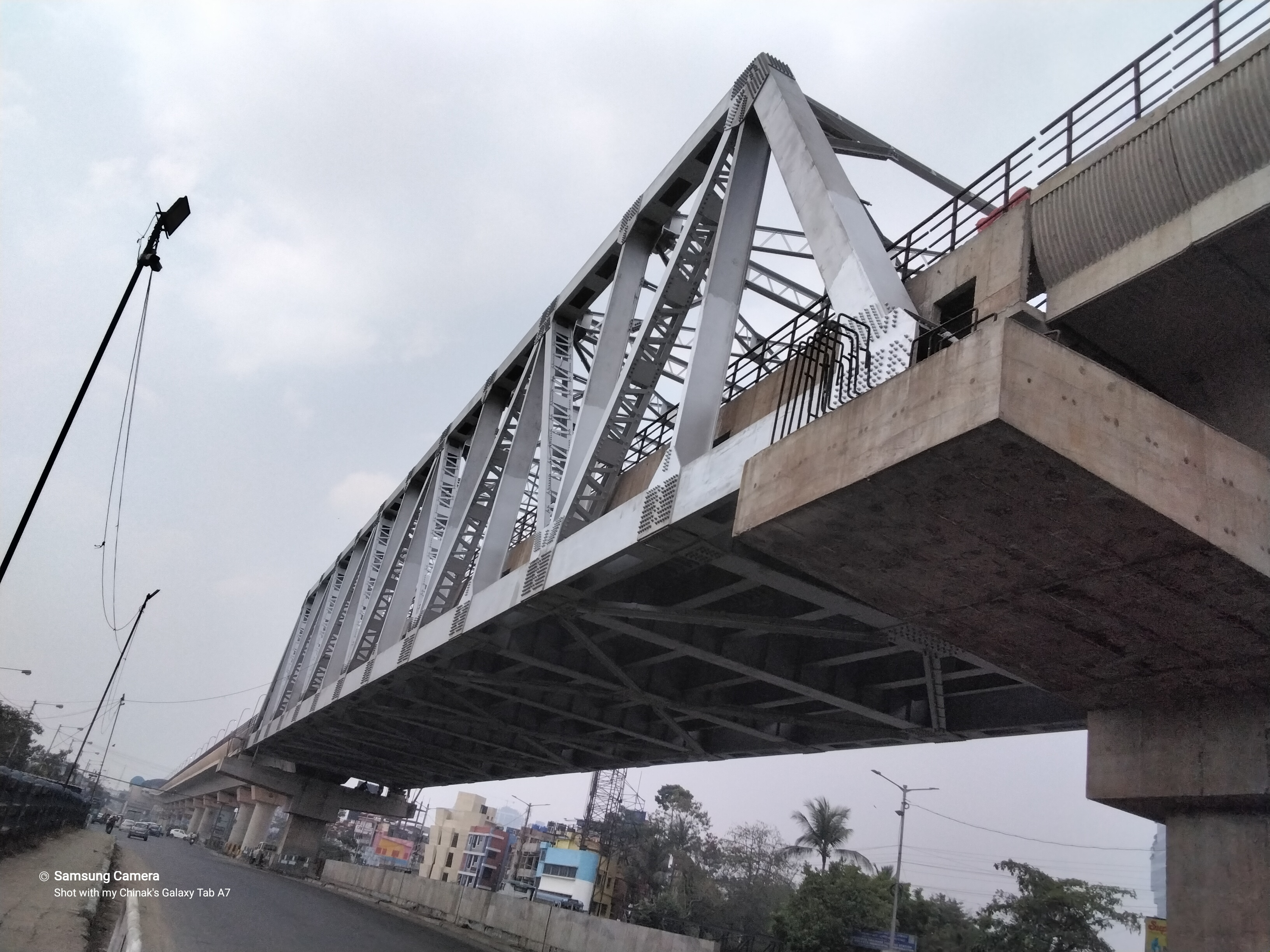
Box bridge between VIP Bazar metro Station and Hemanta Mukhopadhyay Metro Station

== See also ==
- List of Kolkata Metro stations
