= Beleghata metro station =

Metro station in Kolkata, India

Beleghata
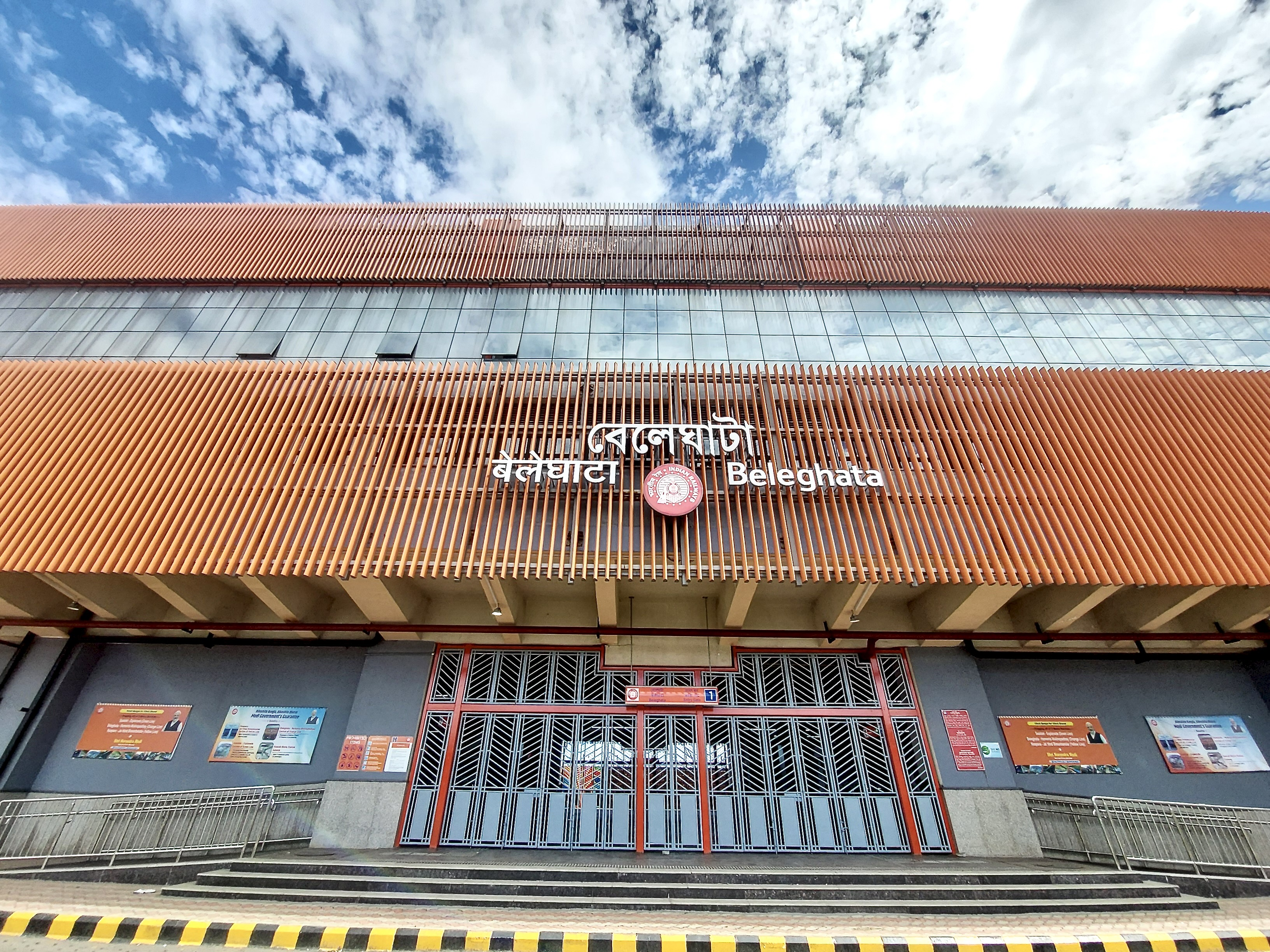
- Main entrance

General information
- Other names: Metropolitan
- Location: Beleghata, Metropolitan, Dhapa; Kolkata, West Bengal 700105; India
- Coordinates: 22.55070°N 88.40409°E
- System: Kolkata Metro
- Operator: Metro Railway, Kolkata
- Line: Orange Line
- Platforms: 2 (2 side platforms)

Construction
- Structure type: Elevated
- Parking: Yes
- Accessible: Yes

Other information
- Status: Operational
- Station code: KBGA

History
- Opened: 22 August 2025; 12 months ago

Services
Preceding station	Kolkata Metro	Following station
Barun Sengupta towards Kavi Subhash	Orange Line	Terminus
Barun Sengupta towards Kavi Subhash	Orange Line (Future service)	Gour Kishore Ghosh towards Jai Hind
Route map
Location

Beleghata (also known as Metropolitan), is a metro station of Orange Line of the Kolkata Metro located in Beleghata at Biswa Bangla Sarani, Dhapa of Kolkata, West Bengal, India, serving Beleghata and Metropolitan areas. The station is elevated beside the Eastern Metropolitan Bypass.

== Location ==
This station is located in Beleghata across the service road and footpath on the eastern side of Biswa Bangla Sarani. The main elevated structure of the station is situated along the service road and footpath adjacent to the New Garia-bound lane of Biswa Bangla Sarani near the end of Maa Flyover. It is geographically located at 22.550703°N 88.404094°E. The previous station of the station is Barun Sengupta metro station at a distance of 0.9 km (0.56 mi) and the next station is Gour Kishore Ghosh metro station at a distance of 1.7 km (1.1 mi).

== History ==
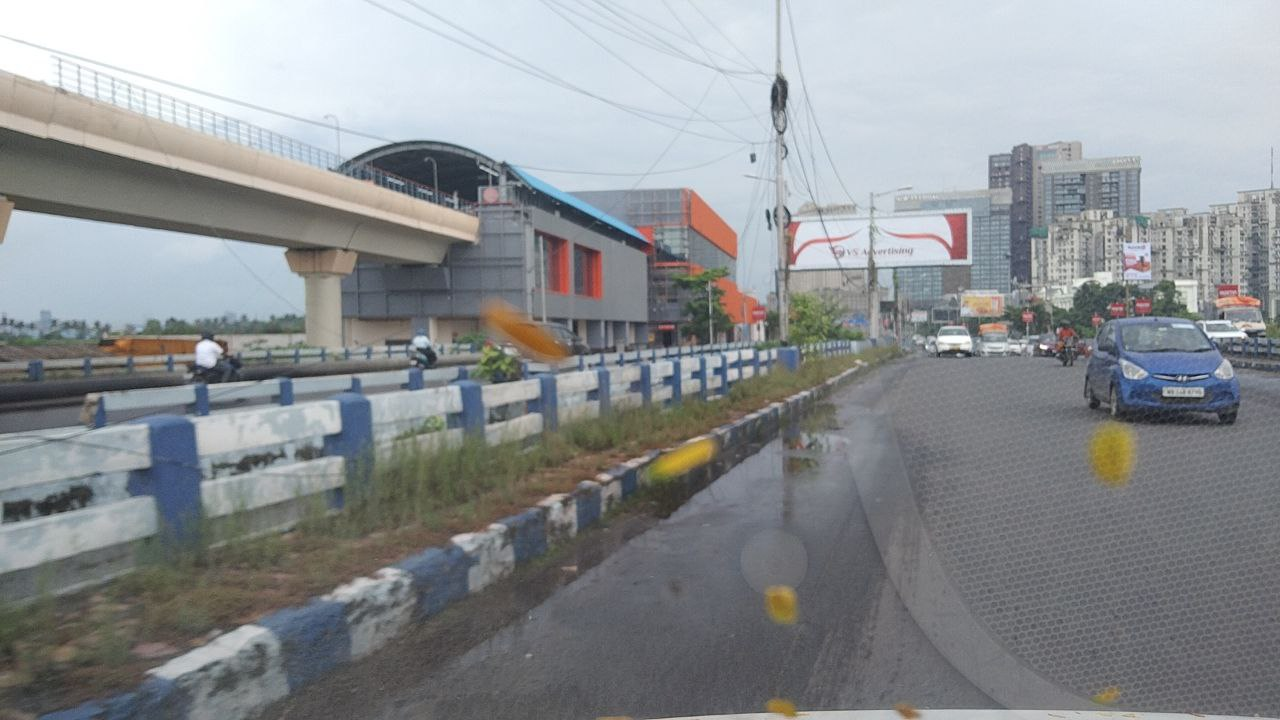
Beleghata metro station

This project was sanctioned in the budget of 2010–11 by Mamata Banerjee with a project deadline of six years. The execution of this project has been entrusted to RVNL at a cost of Rs 3951.98 crore. It will help to reduce travel time between the southern fringes of Kolkata to Netaji Subhas Chandra Bose International Airport. In October 2011, RVNL awarded Gammon India Limited, the tender for the construction of the metro corridor from VIP Bazar Metro Station to Nikko Park (Nalban metro station), including stations, as part of Package-II of Orange Line. Amongst those metro stations, one near Beleghata was also sanctioned. In January 2012, the construction of the metro station along with the metro line started. The construction of the station was stopped in 2015 due to land dispute at Tagore Park culvert and a pair of its own footover bridges. The construction of the station started again in May 2017. But the metro couldn't be started due to a viaduct gap over Tagore Park culvert.

A week later after inauguration and a day after commercial run started on Kavi Subhash-Hemanta Mukhopadhyay section, in March 2024, RVNL announced the completion of that 76 m viaduct gap after construction of a single-span hanging steel bridge over the disputed Tagore Park culvert. This completed the viaduct upto Beleghata metro station, clearing the way for commercial operations at this station. Trial runs have started in March 2024.

By November 2024, for the Beleghata station and the stretch from Hemanta Mukhopadhyay till IT Centre metro station to be inaugurated, construction of safety limit of 90 m (300 ft) metro viaduct beyond the station is completed. The station was opened on 22 August 2025 as a part of Hemanta Mukhopadhyay–Beleghata Orange Line extension. However, the footover bridge is yet to be connected from both side of road, as RVNL didn't received traffic clearances for its construction from Kolkata Police. On the other hand, filling a 366 m (1,201 ft) gap between Chingrighata crossing and Gour Kishore Ghosh metro station and construction of Gour Kishore Ghosh, Nalban and IT Centre metro station is yet to be completed.

== Station ==
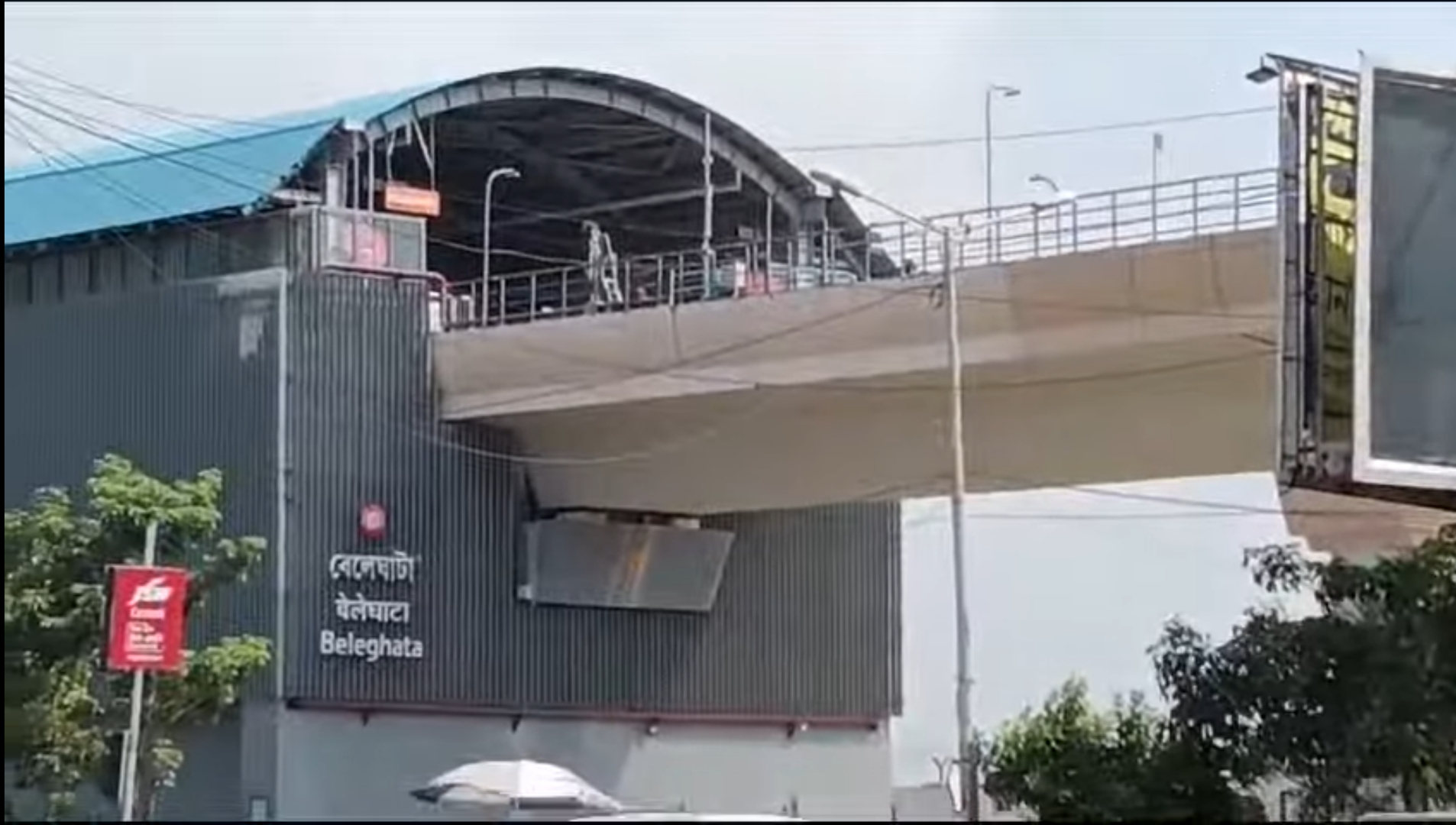
Beleghata metro station

=== Structure ===
Beleghata Metro Station is an elevated metro station and has a total of 4 levels. Station entrances and exits begin or end at the first level or ground level. Second-level or L1 or intermediate level houses station fare control, station agents, metro vending machines, crossovers, etc. The third level or L2 or the final level houses the platforms and rail tracks. The fourth level or L3 contains shopping complexes and eateries. The station is 200 meters long and 25 meters wide.

The station has four entrances and exits. The station is being built with state-of-the-art technology. In addition to staircases, it will be equipped with lifts and escalators. The station also has drinking water and toilet facilities.

=== Layout ===
L3	Commercial Podium	Shopping complex, eateries
L2	Side platform, Doors will open on the left
L2	Platform 1	Alighting only →
L2	Platform 2	← Train towards Kavi Subhash (Barun Sengupta)
L2	Side platform, Doors will open on the left
L1	Concourse	Fare control, station agent, Metro QR ticket vending machines, crossover
G	Street level	Exit/Entrance

== Power and signal systems ==
Like other stations and lines of Kolkata Metro, this station has 750 volt DC powered third rail. The electricity system will be used to operate the train.

Train movement at this station will be managed by communication based train control signaling system. With this signal system, trains can be operated at intervals of 90 seconds.

== See also ==
- List of Kolkata Metro stations
