= Dakshin Behala =

- Neighbourhood in Kolkata (Calcutta)
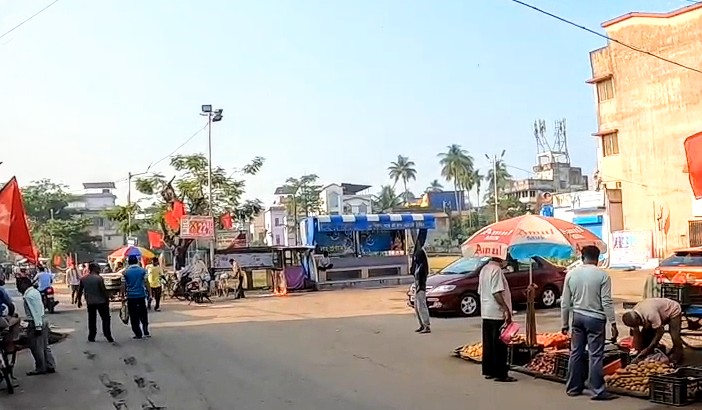
- Sasthir More, Dakshin Behala

- Location in Kolkata
- Coordinates: 22.4696°N 88.2975°E
- Country: India
- State: West Bengal
- City: Kolkata
- District: Kolkata
- Metro Station: Thakurpukur, Sakherbazar
- Municipal Corporation: Kolkata Municipal Corporation
- KMC ward: 125, 126

Population
  - Total: For population see linked KMC ward page
- Time zone: UTC+5:30 (IST)
- PIN: 700 061
- Area code: +91 33
- Lok Sabha constituency: Kolkata Dakshin
- Vidhan Sabha constituency: Behala Paschim

Dakshin Behala is a locality of South Kolkata in West Bengal, India. It is a part of Behala region. It is under the jurisdiction of Kolkata Police and Kolkata Municipal Corporation.

== Location ==
Dakshin Behala borders Bakultala to the north and Anandanagar colony H Block to the south.

It composed of many small localities like Sastir more, Chandra Pally, Samsan Kalitala, Battala, Ghosh Para, Nator colony, Basudevpur, Bakultala, Basundhara Park, Ananda Nagar, Khudiram Pally, Dutta'r math area etc.

== Administration ==
The area is under the jurisdiction of Thakurpukur Police Station and Sarsuna Police Station of South West Division (Behala Division) of Kolkata Police.

== Transportation ==
=== Bus ===
- M7C: Sasthir More - Howrah Station
- M7K: Khudiram Pally - Sealdah

=== Auto Routes ===
- Chandra Pally - Silpara
- Anandanagar - Thakurpukur
- Khudiram Pally - Thakurpukur
