= Barisha Chandi Mela =

Annual 10-day religious festival in Kolkata, India

Barisha Chandi Mela বড়িশা চণ্ডী মেলা
- Status: Active
- Genre: Religious, cultural, and folk festival
- Date: Late November to early December (Month of Agrahayana/Magh)
- Frequency: Annual
- Locations: Chandi Mandir grounds, Sakher Bazar, Barisha, Behala
- Country: India
- Years active: 1792–present (234 years)
- Founder: Mahesh Chandra Roy Chowdhury
- Attendance: Hundreds of thousands (lakhs) annually
- Organizer: Sabarna Roy Chowdhury family and Barisha Sarbojanin Committee

The Barisha Chandi Mela (বড়িশা চণ্ডী মেলা) is an annual ten-day religious and cultural festival in the Barisha region of Behala in South Kolkata, West Bengal, India. The festival began in 1792 under the direction of the Sabarna Roy Chowdhury family. The fair takes place alongside the annual Sri Sri Chandi Puja.

The event marks the annual worship of Goddess Chandi, who is an incarnation of Durga. The festival transitioned from a private household ritual within a zamindari estate into a public event managed by the local community.

== History ==
The settlement history of Barisha predates the urban consolidation of Calcutta by the East India Company. In 1608, the Mughal administration granted regional tenancy rights to Lakshmikanta Majumdar, who established the Sabarna Roy Chowdhury line. Barisha became a residential base for branches of this family. According to family records, the annual public Chandi Puja and its accompanying market were established in the Bengali year 1200, which corresponds to 1792 CE, by Mahesh Chandra Roy Chowdhury.

Local accounts state that the site of the current shrine was originally marked by an ancient tree next to a community water tank at a site known as Chandi Maath. According to these accounts, Mahesh Chandra Roy Chowdhury directed the retrieval of a brass pitcher from the tank following a dream. The pitcher was placed inside the family household, known as the Chandi Bari, for daily worship. To create a public clay idol, family members consulted Sanskrit scholars from Bhatpara to establish the specific physical attributes of the deity.

== Religious rituals ==
The central object of daily worship is the brass pitcher retrieved in 1792, which remains at the center of the altar. For the annual winter festival, artisans build a clay idol based on distinct iconographic parameters. The deity is depicted with a red complexion, three eyes, and four arms. The hands hold a rosary and a text, and display traditional hand gestures. The idol is placed upon a platform designated as a Panchamundi Asana. The main figure is surrounded by eight smaller companion deities known as the Ashta Nayika.

During the late 18th and 19th centuries, the ritual included animal sacrifices financed by the estate. These practices were systematically modified during the 20th century. The sacrifice of buffaloes was ended by the family administrators, and all remaining animal sacrifices were discontinued by 1972. The rituals currently use fruit and vegetable offerings. The permanent temple building was rebuilt in the mid-20th century using funds collected from charitable public theatrical productions.

== The Fair ==
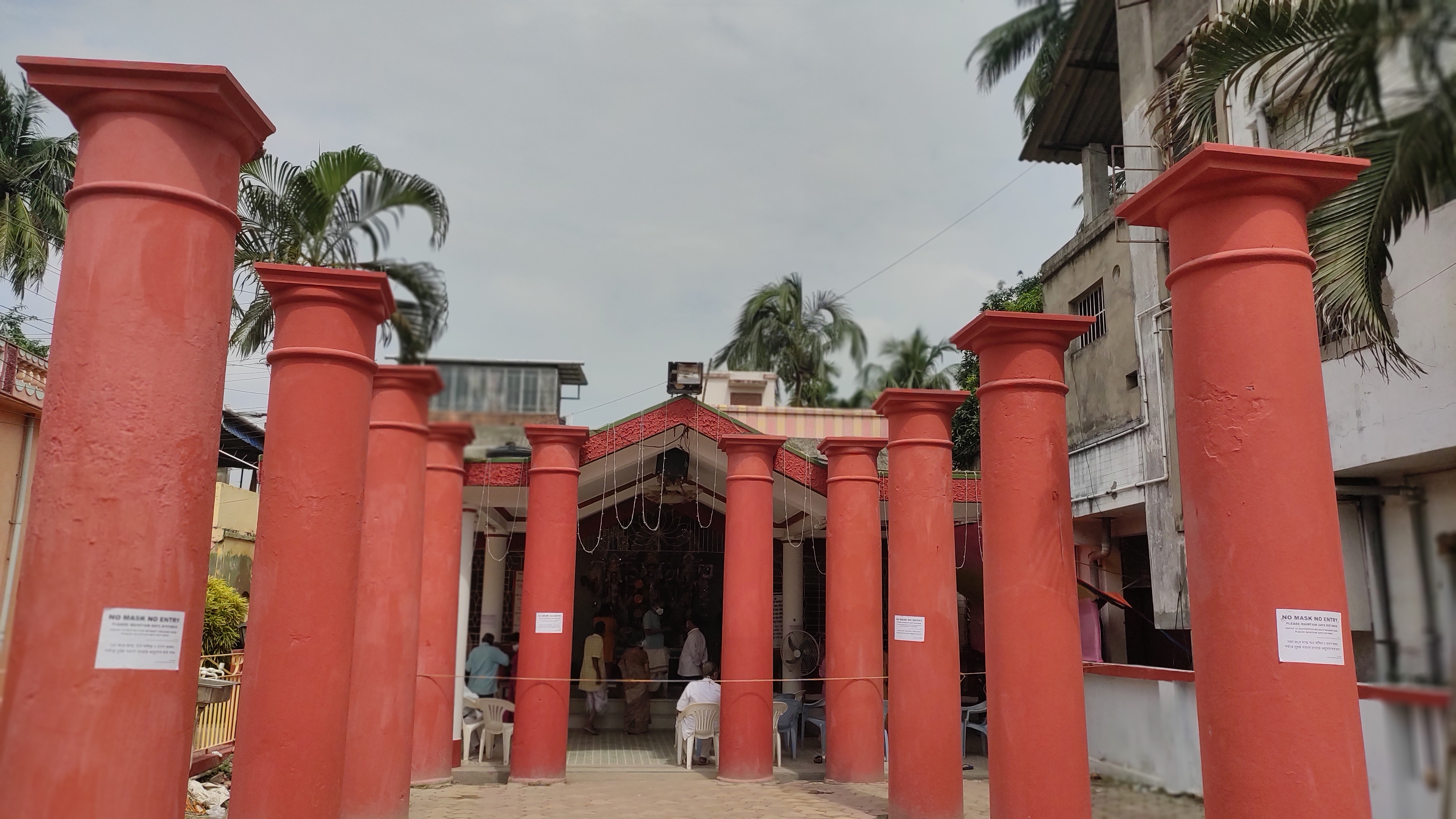
The Sabarna Roy Chowdhury household grounds in Barisha during a seasonal autumn festival.

The commercial fair runs for ten consecutive days alongside the religious observations. The stalls occupy the land surrounding the primary Chandi Mandap on K.K. Roy Chowdhury Road near Sakher Bazar in Behala.

The fair operates as a seasonal market where regional producers and artisans from adjacent districts sell goods directly to the public. Stalls sell handloom textiles, regional pottery, ironwork, wooden kitchen items, and traditional local food items.

The fair previously hosted traditional performing arts, including folk theater performances and musical presentations. The contemporary fair includes commercial stalls and amusement structures managed under the joint supervision of the Sabarna Roy Chowdhury family council and the Barisha Sarbojanin committee.

== Transport ==
The festival site is accessible through multiple transit options:

- Metro: The Sakher Bazar metro station on the Purple Line is within walking distance of the temple. The Mahanayak Uttam Kumar station on the Blue Line connects to the area via local auto-rickshaw routes.
- Rail: The closest regional railway station is Majherhat railway station.
- Road: Municipal bus routes connect the location via Diamond Harbour Road.

== See also ==
- Sabarna Roy Chowdhury
- Behala
