= Behala =

Neighbourhood of Kolkata, India

- Neighbourhood
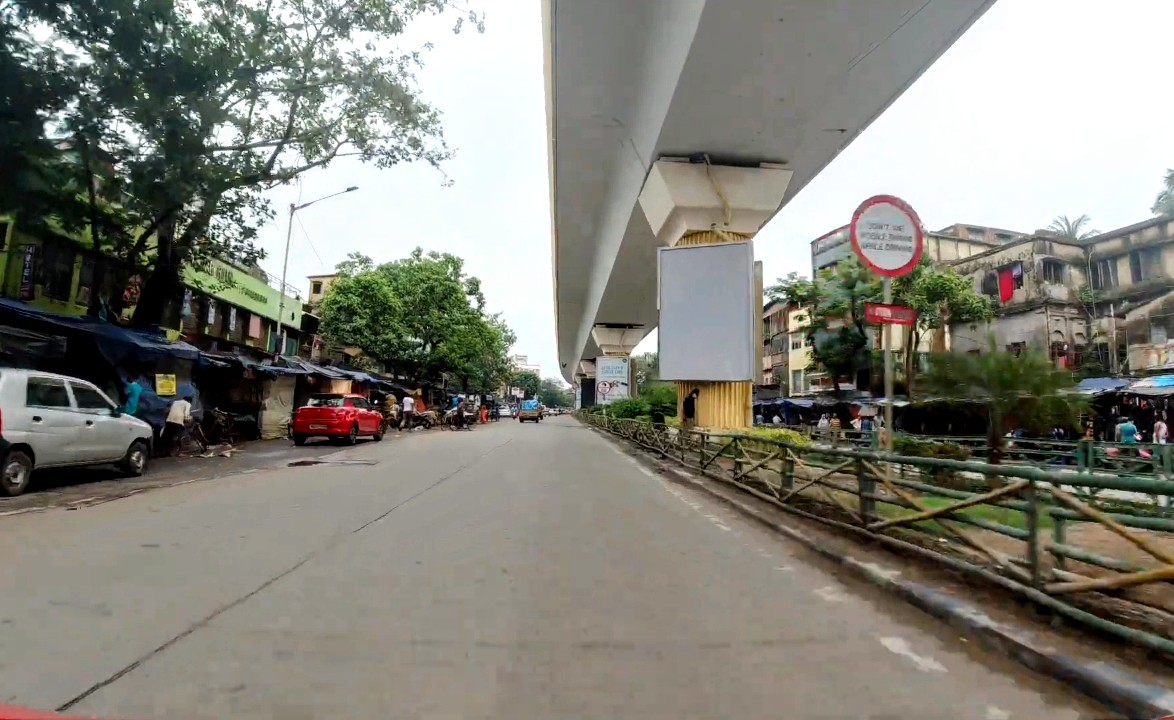
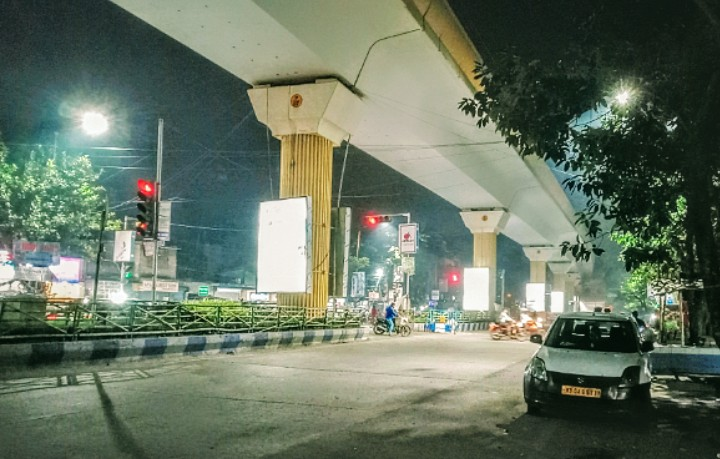
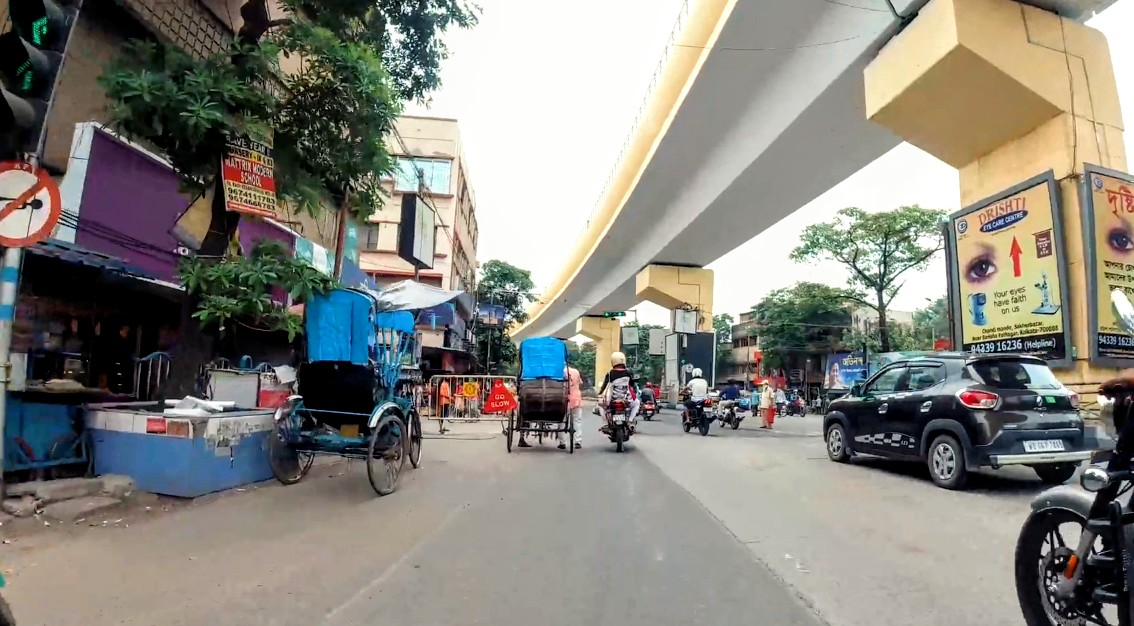
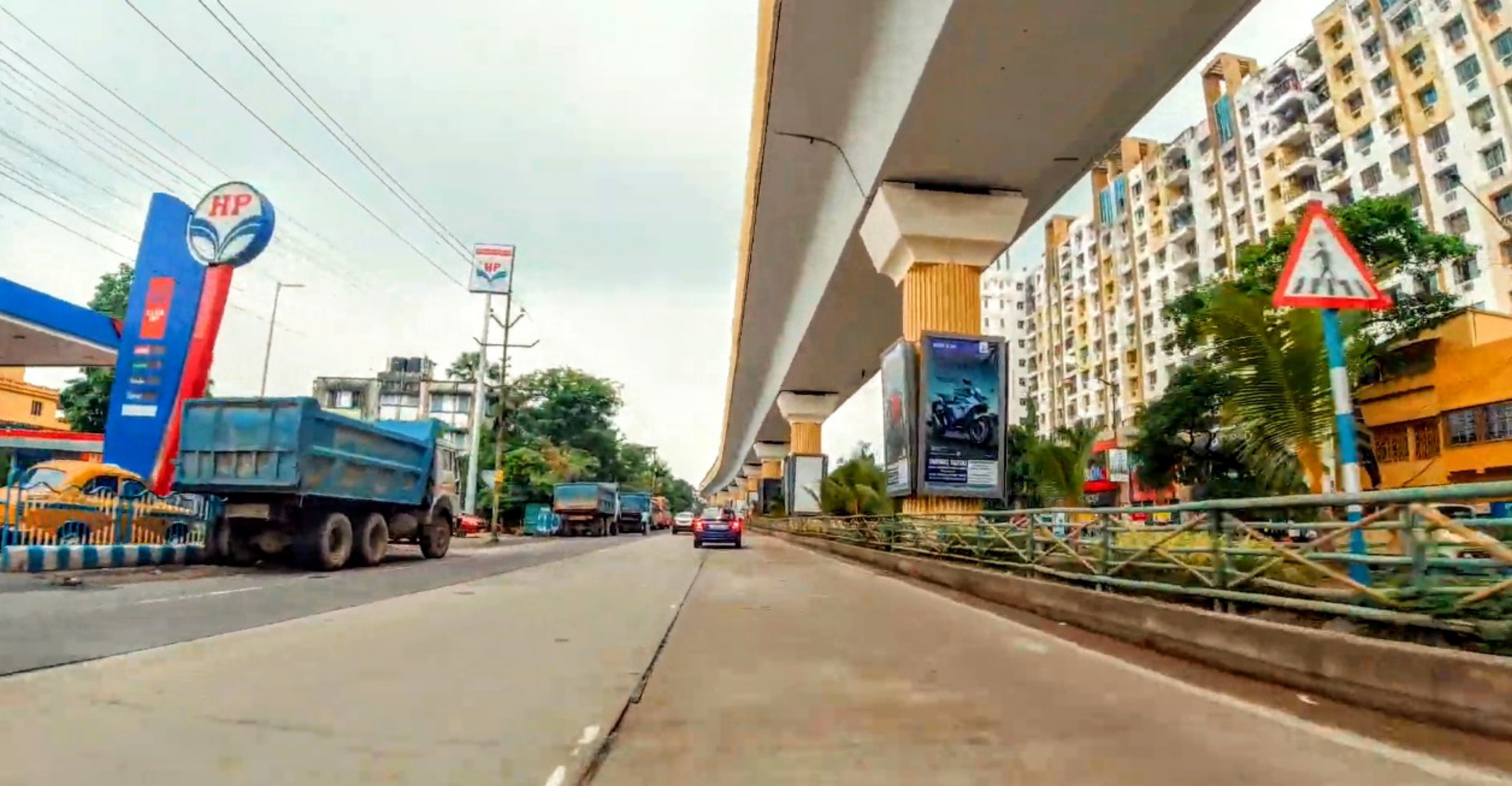
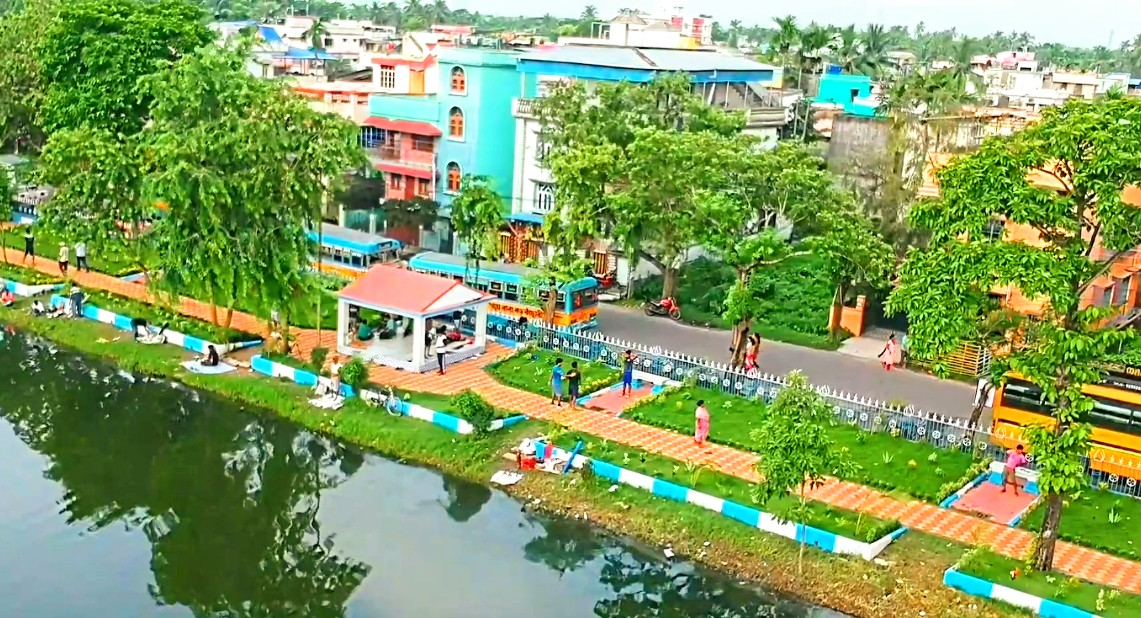
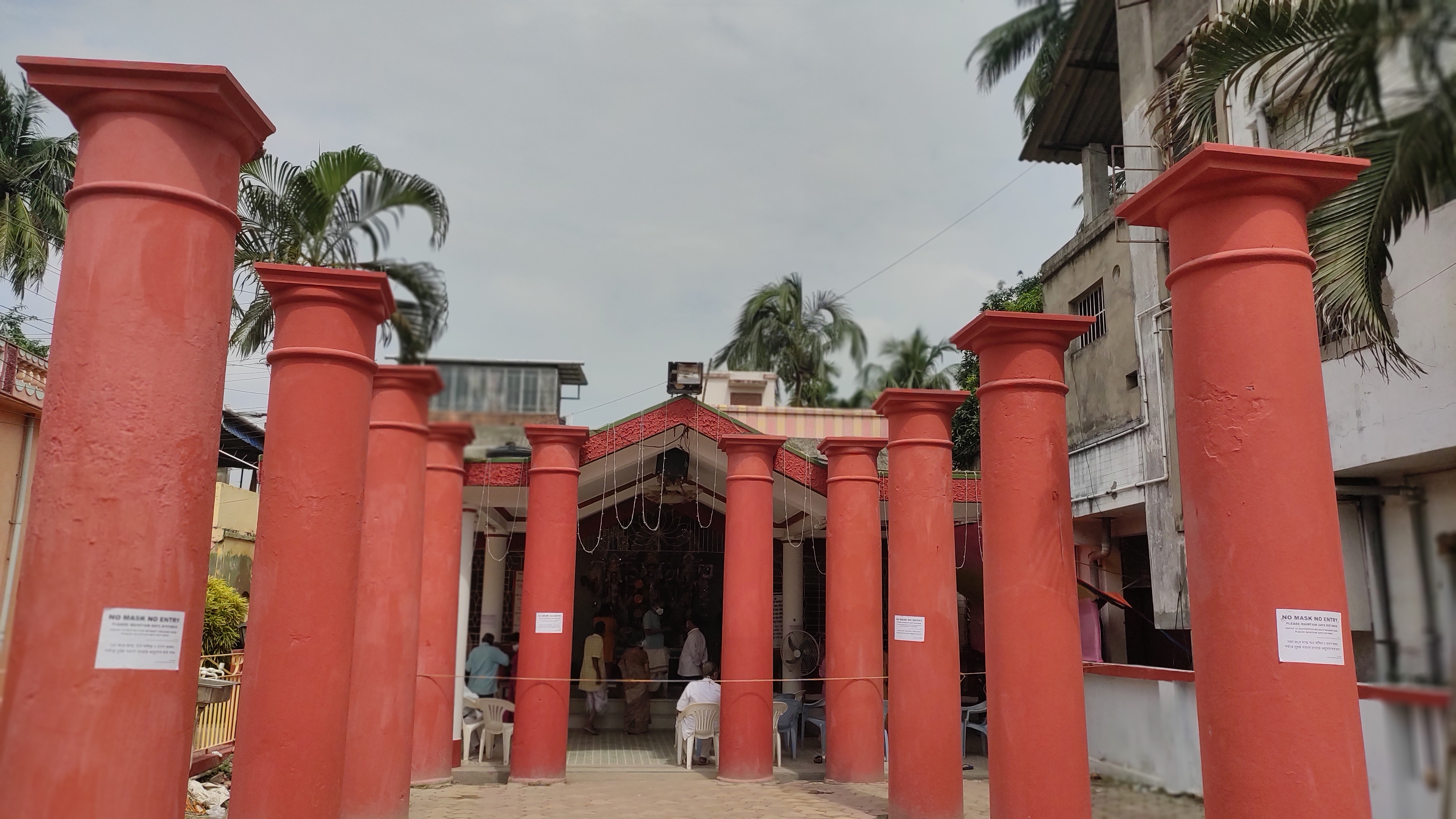
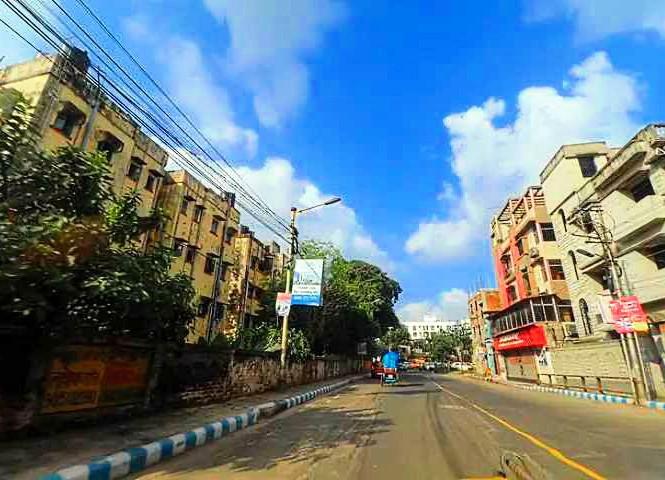
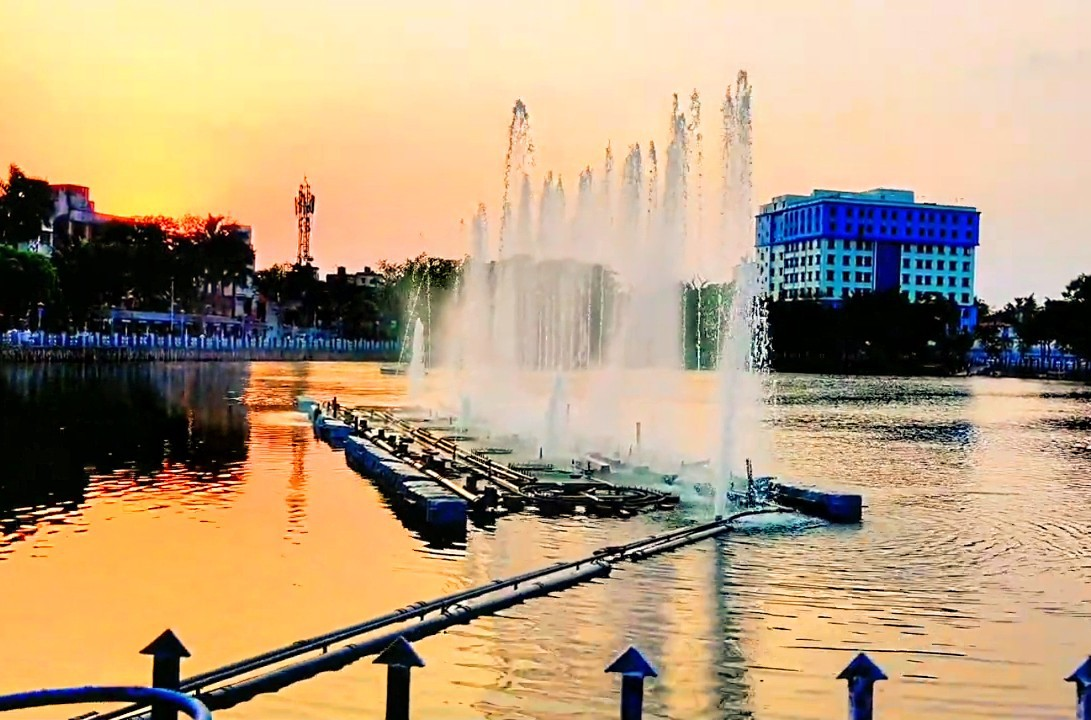
- 1: Behala Tram Depot, D.H Road 2: Barisha Silpara D.H Road 3: Barisha Sakherbazar Crossing 4: Thakurpukur, D.H Road 5: Sarsuna Satellite Township 6: Atchala Bari, Barisha Sabarna para 7: James Long Sarani 8: Parnasree Pally Lake

- Location in Kolkata
- Coordinates: 22.4981°N 88.3108°E
- Country: India
- State: West Bengal
- District: South 24 Parganas
- City: Kolkata
- Metro Station: Taratala; Behala Bazar; Behala Chowrasta; Sakherbazar; Thakurpukur
- Municipal Corporation: Kolkata Municipal Corporation
- KMC wards: 115, 116, 117, 118, 119, 120, 121, 122, 123, 124, 125, 126, 127, 128, 129, 130, 131 and 132
- Elevation: 36 ft (11 m)
- Time zone: UTC+5:30 (IST)
- PIN codes: 700034 (Behala), 700060 (Parnasree Pally), 700061 (Dakshin Behala), 700061 (Sarsuna), 700008 (Barisha), 700063 (Thakurpukur), 700038 (Sahapur), 700082 (Haridevpur partially)
- Area code: +91 33
- Lok Sabha constituency: Kolkata Dakshin
- Vidhan Sabha constituency: Behala Paschim and Behala Purba

Behala is a neighbourhood of South Kolkata in South 24 parganas district, located in the Indian state of West Bengal. It is broadly spread across wards 115–132 of the Kolkata Municipal Corporation. The locality is divided into two Vidhan Sabha constituencies, Behala Paschim and Behala Purba, and is served by the southwest division of the Kolkata Police, also known as Behala Division.

Behala is one of the oldest residential areas in Kolkata. During the Mughal era, it was the home of the Sabarna Roy Choudhury family, one of the oldest zamindar families in western Bengal and the trustees of the nearby Kalighat Kali Temple. The neighborhood is also home to Sourav Ganguly, a former captain of the Indian national cricket team, and Sovan Chatterjee, who served as the mayor of Kolkata from 2010 to 2018.

Since the 17th century, Behala has hosted the second-oldest continuously held Durga Puja festival in West Bengal. The festival was first held in the sub-locality of Barisha by Laksmikanta Majumdar in 1610. The neighborhood also hosts the Chandi Mela, a 10-day festival dedicated to the Hindu deity Chandi that has been held annually in November since 1792.

== Etymology ==
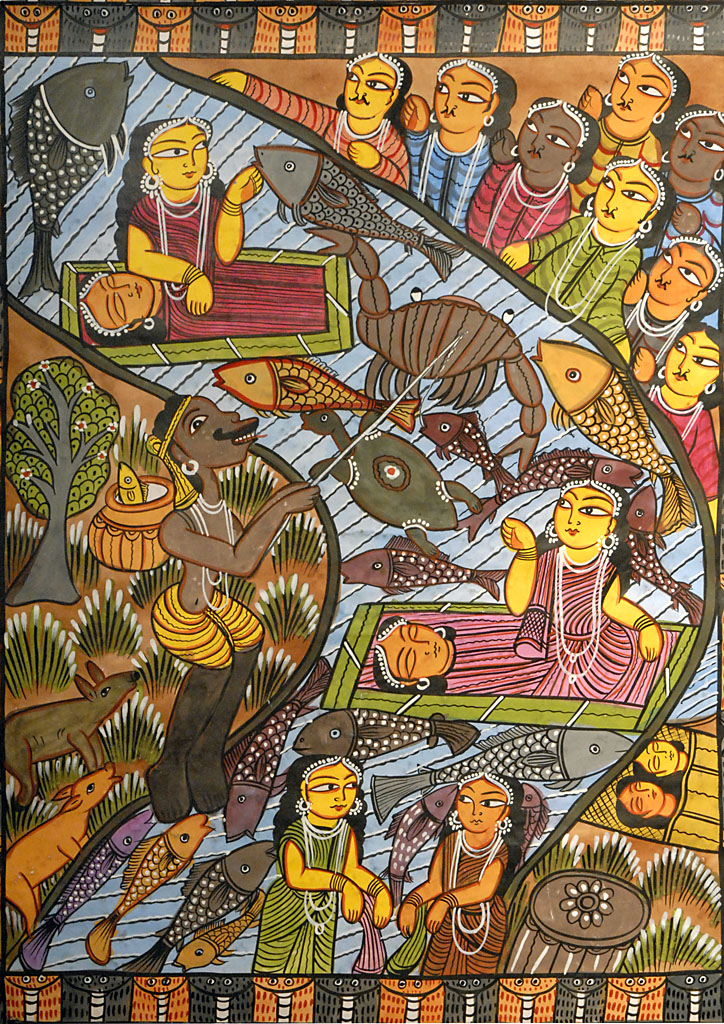
Behula's (top, left) journey, as depicted in the folk art of West Bengal. The word Behala is commonly believed to have its root in Behula's name

The word Behala is commonly believed to have its root in Behula, the female protagonist of the Bengali narrative Manasamangal Kāvya. Alternatively, the name may have been derived from the Bengali term Bahulapur ("land of many rivers" or "dark city"). "Bahula" is also an epithet of the goddesses Chandi and Kali. Rev. James Long, an Anglican priest who lived in Kolkata during the 19th century, described the name of the neighborhood as Byala in one of his early works.

Prior to the locality's urbanization, Behala comprised several small, largely independent villages, with each village name containing the suffix -behala,. Examples of this include the old village names of Bazarbehala, Tamtelbehala, and Sorshunnobehala (known today as Sarsuna). The additional names of Rajarbaganbehala, Sahapurbehala, Naskarpurbehala, and Santoshbatibehala are found in old records of the South Suburban Municipality in Tollygunge.

== History ==
During the early 1980s, Behala experienced a period of rapid population growth due to a large influx of blue-collar and white-collar professionals. The largest road in the neighborhood, Diamond Harbour Road, serves as the locality's primary conduit for vehicular traffic. In 2017, the road was closed along multiple stretches due to the construction of an overpass near Taratala; this caused traffic to be diverted to the parallel James Long Sarani road, promoting development in the adjoining areas of the neighborhood. The main roads in Behala are often encroached upon by street vendors.

Prior to 2006, a series of trams provided transportation services through Behala from Joka to Mominpur via the Diamond Harbour Road. However, the service was ended due to ongoing construction of the Taratala flyover, leaving an orphaned line from Behala to Joka that was later abandoned. The subsequent loss of inter-connectivity between the tram lines led to additional traffic in the neighborhood. To alleviate the congestion, an elevated metro railway was constructed on Diamond Harbour Road to replace the defunct tram line and provide service to Behala as part of the Kolkata Metro's Purple Line.

On 24 March 2017, Mamata Banerjee, the chief minister of West Bengal, visited Behala to inaugurate the newly constructed SL Dhanuka Girls' Hostel on Diamond Harbour Road.

== Geography ==
=== Location ===
Behala is one of the largest suburbs in the city of Kolkata. It consists of numerous localities, including Barisha, New Alipore, Parnasree Pally, Shakuntala Park, Thakurpukur, Haridevpur, Dakshin Behala, Sarsuna, and Joka.

=== Police district ===
The greater Behala area is part of the southwest division (also known as the Behala Division) of the Kolkata Police Department. The neighborhood is serviced by Taratala Police station, Behala Police station, Thakurpukur Police Station, Parnashree Police station, Sarsuna Police station, and Haridevpur Police station. A separate women's police station is located at the Behala Police station, and also covers the same districts within Behala.

== Education ==
Several secondary and post-secondary educational institutions are located in Behala.

=== Colleges ===
- Behala College, an affiliate institution of the University of Calcutta
- Sarsuna Law College, an affiliate institution of Bankura University
- Vivekananda College

=== Schools ===
- Barisha High School
- M.P. Birla Foundation Higher Secondary School

== Transport ==
Multiple metro, railway and bus stations provide transportation service in Behala. The 2018 collapse of Majerhat bridge, which connected Bahela to the downtown areas of Kolkata, led to a significant increase in traffic congestion until the completion of the Jai Hind bridge in 2020 restored the connection.

=== Bus routes ===
WBTC

- S-4 (Parnasree - Karunamoyee)
- AC-4 (Parnasree - Howrah Stn)
- AC-49 (Parnasree - Ecospace)
- AC-4A (Parnasree - Ecospace)
- S-4D (Parnasree - Ecospace)
- E-4 (Parnasree - Howrah Stn)
- S-31 (Behala Chowrasta - Jadavpur)
- AC-31 (Behala Chowrasta - Jadavpur)
- S-22 (Shakuntala Park - Karunamoyee)
- S-45 (Shakuntala Park - Baghbazar)
- AC-12D (Howrah Stn - Joka)
- AC-52 (Howrah Stn - Amtala)
- ACT-41 (Belgachia - Joka)
- 7A (Sarsuna - Howrah Stn)
- EB-16 (Thakurpukur - Hatisala)
- S-3B (Behala 14 no. - Kankurgachi)
- S-3W (Joka Tram Depot - Ecospace)
- S-12D (Howrah Stn - Joka)
- S-16 (Thakurpukur - Karunamoyee)
- M-14 (Behala 14 no. - Ecospace)
- C-37 (Amtala - Howrah Stn)

=== Tram ===
Prior to 2011, several tram routes ran from Behala to the Esplanade. After the construction of an overpass in Taratala in 2006, the route was truncated and finally closed in 2011 following the launch of a Kolkata Metro line connecting the Esplanade to Joka via Behala.

=== Railway ===
Behala is serviced by railway stations located in Majherhat, Brace Bridge and New Alipore. All three stations are part of the Sealdah South section of the Kolkata Suburban Railway.

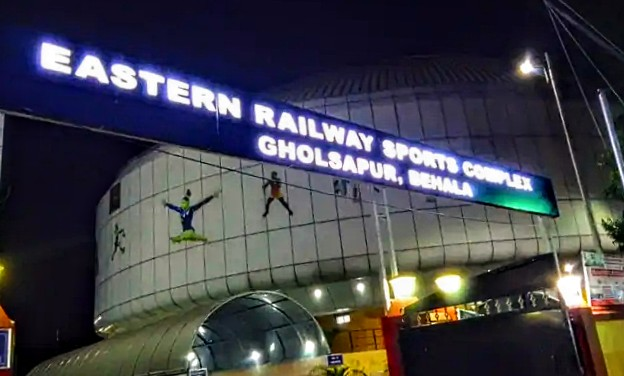
Eastern Railway Sports Complex

Prior to 1957, Behala was also served by the Gholesapur, Sakherbazar, and Thakurpukur railway stations of the Kalighat Falta Railway (KFR). Following KFR's closure, the train tracks were converted into the James Long Sarani road.

=== Airport ===
Behala Airport, commonly known as the Behala Flying Training Institute (BFTI), is the second of two airports in the Kolkata Metropolitan Area, the other being the Netaji Subhas Chandra Bose International Airport. In 2011, plans were announced to renovate and expand the airport in order to accommodate more traffic. A commercial helicopter route connecting Behala Airport to Digha and Durgapur was suspended in 2018.

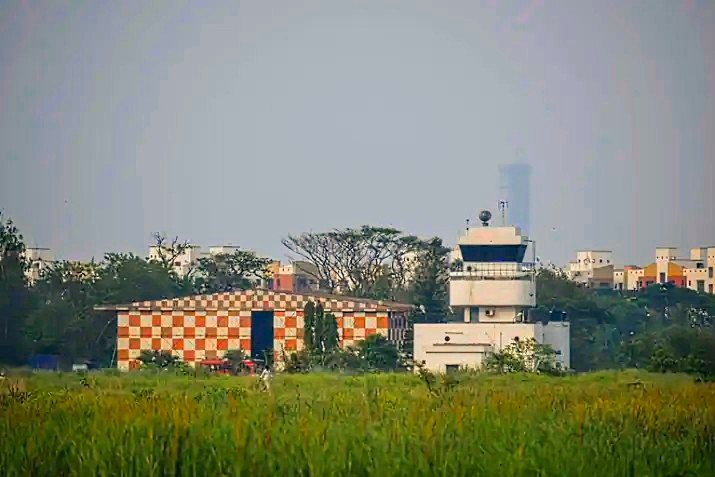
Behala Airport

=== Metro Railway ===
In 2010, a Kolkata Metro route connecting Joka to the Esplanade via Behala began construction; the foundation stone was laid by Indian president Pratibha Patil in a ceremony boycotted by officials of the ruling Communist Party of India (Marxist). The completed metro was inaugurated by the Indian prime minister Narendra Modi on 30 December 2022.

Seven active metro stations provide service to Behala: Joka Metro Station, Thakurpukur Metro Station, Sakherbazar Metro Station, Behala Chowrasta Metro Station, Behala Bazaar Metro Station, Taratala Metro Station, and Majherhat Metro Station. An additional metro station at the Esplanade is under construction, and is expected to be completed by 2029.

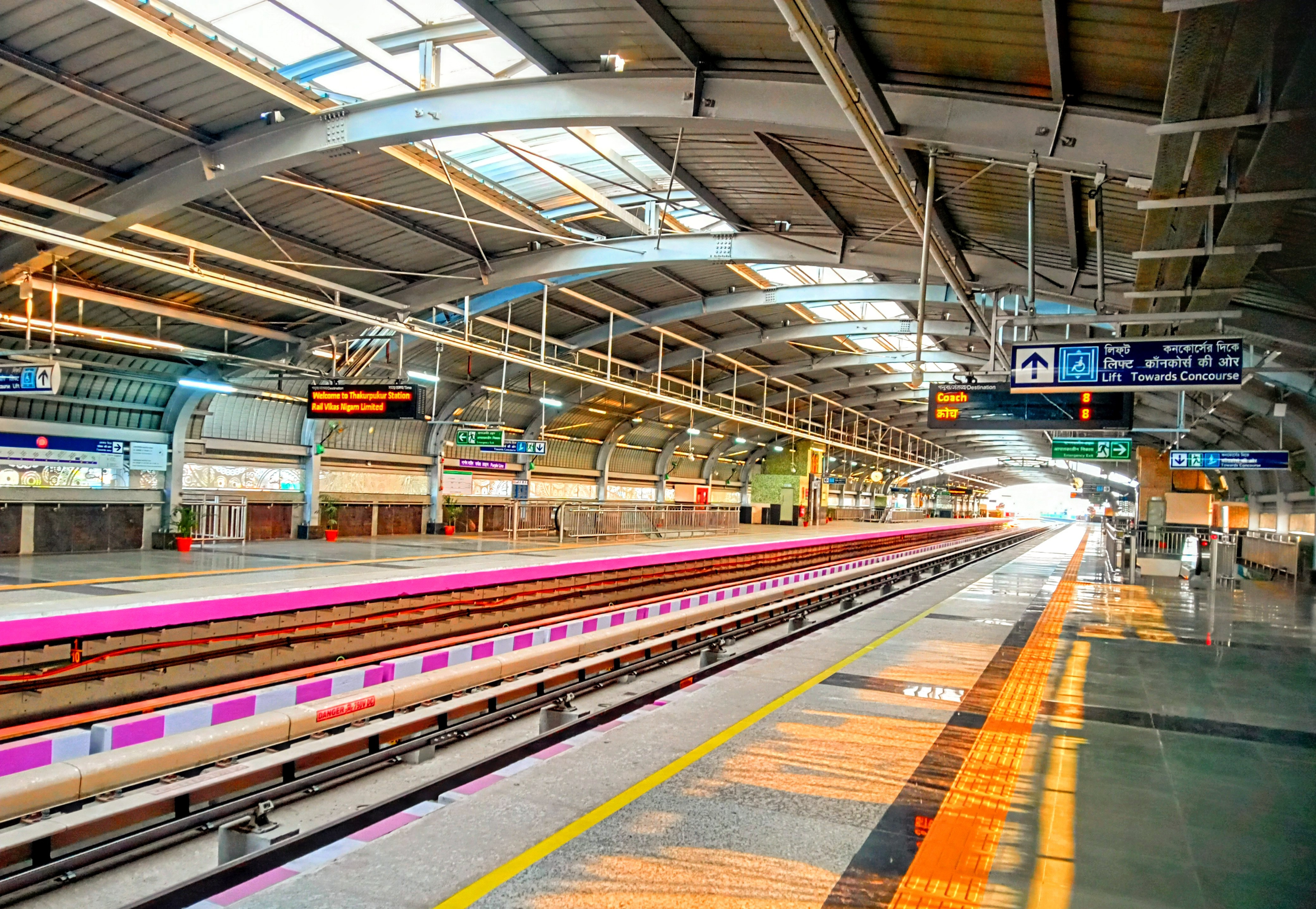
Thakurpukur Metro station

== Healthcare ==
Vidyasagar State General Hospital, a 1,100-bed hospital located near the Behala Bazaar metro station, serves as the primary state-owned medical care facility in Behala. In 2024, the hospital was attacked by a mob of over 100 people following the death of a patient on the hospital's premises.

The Saroj Gupta Cancer Centre and Research Institute, founded in 1973 by oncologist Saroj Gupta, is one of the oldest cancer treatment centers in Kolkata. Located in Thakurpukur, the 311-bed facility offers subsidized cancer treatment to adults and children and conducts blood drives in conjunction with the Bochasanwasi Akshar Purushottam Swaminarayan Sanstha.

Behala is also serviced by multiple private hospitals and Apollo clinics. One of the neighborhood's prominent private hospitals, Narayan Memorial Hospital, was ordered to pay a Rs. 30 lakh fine by the state government in 2026 for "serious lapses in patient care."

== Festivals ==
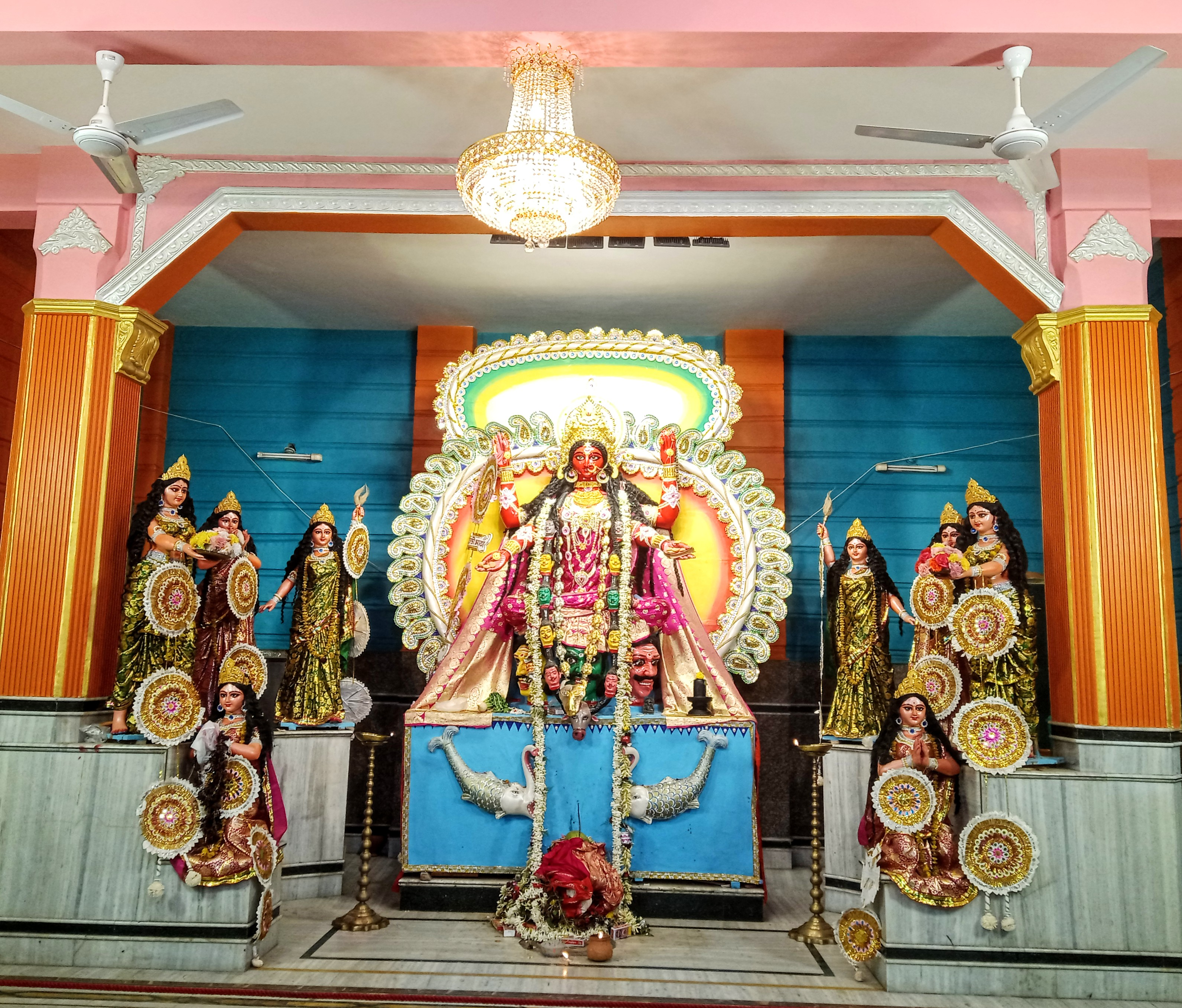
Idol of Chandi

The Chandi Mela, a 10-day fair held between November and December in the locality of Barisha, attracts numerous artists and street performers. The festival has been held annually since 1792, and is dedicated to Chandi, a form of the Hindu goddess Durga.

During the annual Durga Puja festival in Kolkata, a series of theme-based Durga Pujas are held in Behala and neighboring localities. In 2024, the cultural organization Behala Nutan Dal collaborated with the Irish embassy in India to display a pandal honoring Durga alongside Danu, a folk goddess of Irish mythology. The following year, the "Behala Friends Durga Puja" featured exhibits highlighting the humanitarian crisis in Gaza and the Bengal famine of 1943.

Jagaddhatri, a five-day festival, is also commonly celebrated in Behala.

== Places of interest ==
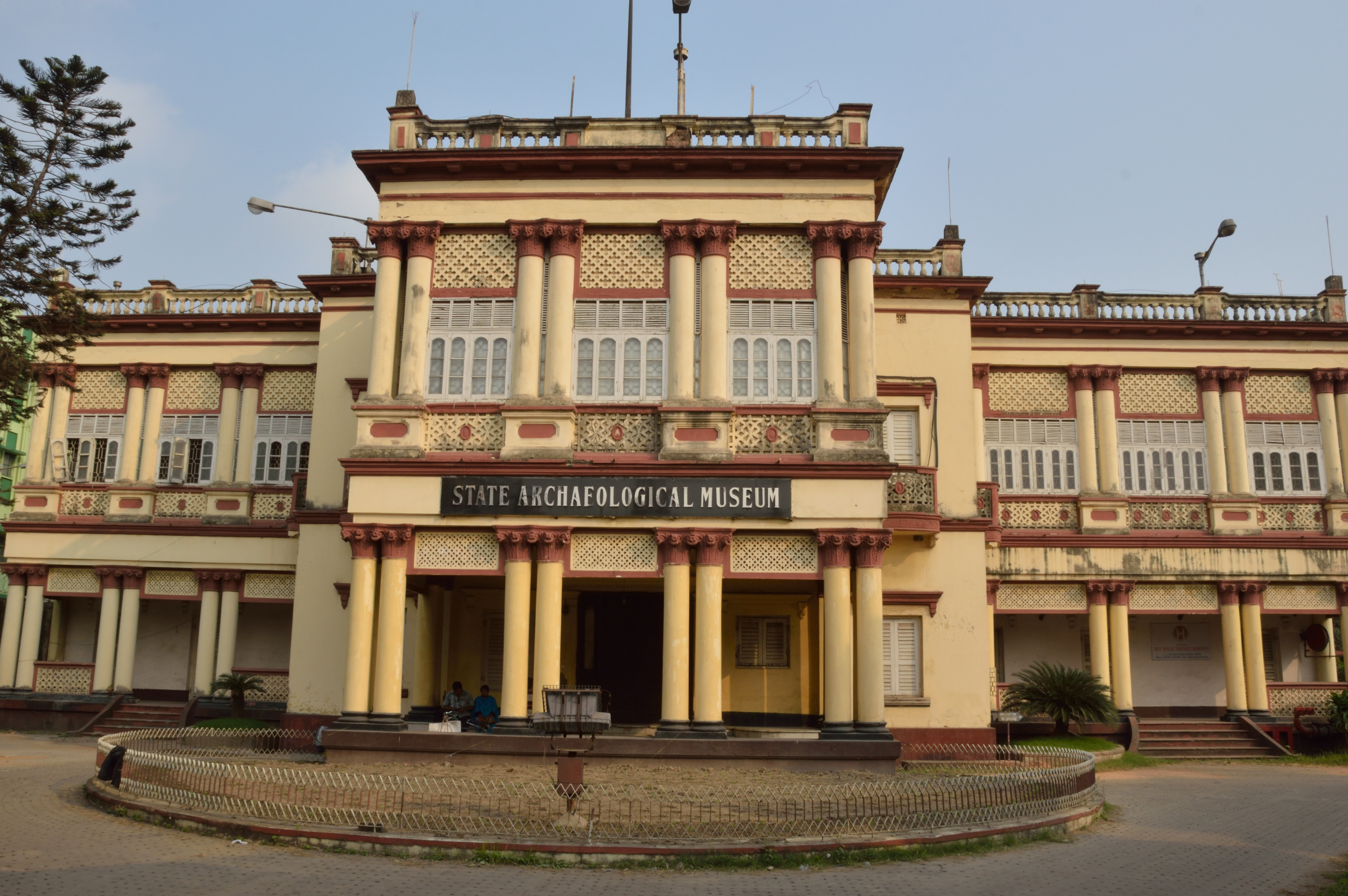
State Archaeological Museum

- State Archaeological Museum, an archaeological museum on Satyen Roy Road.

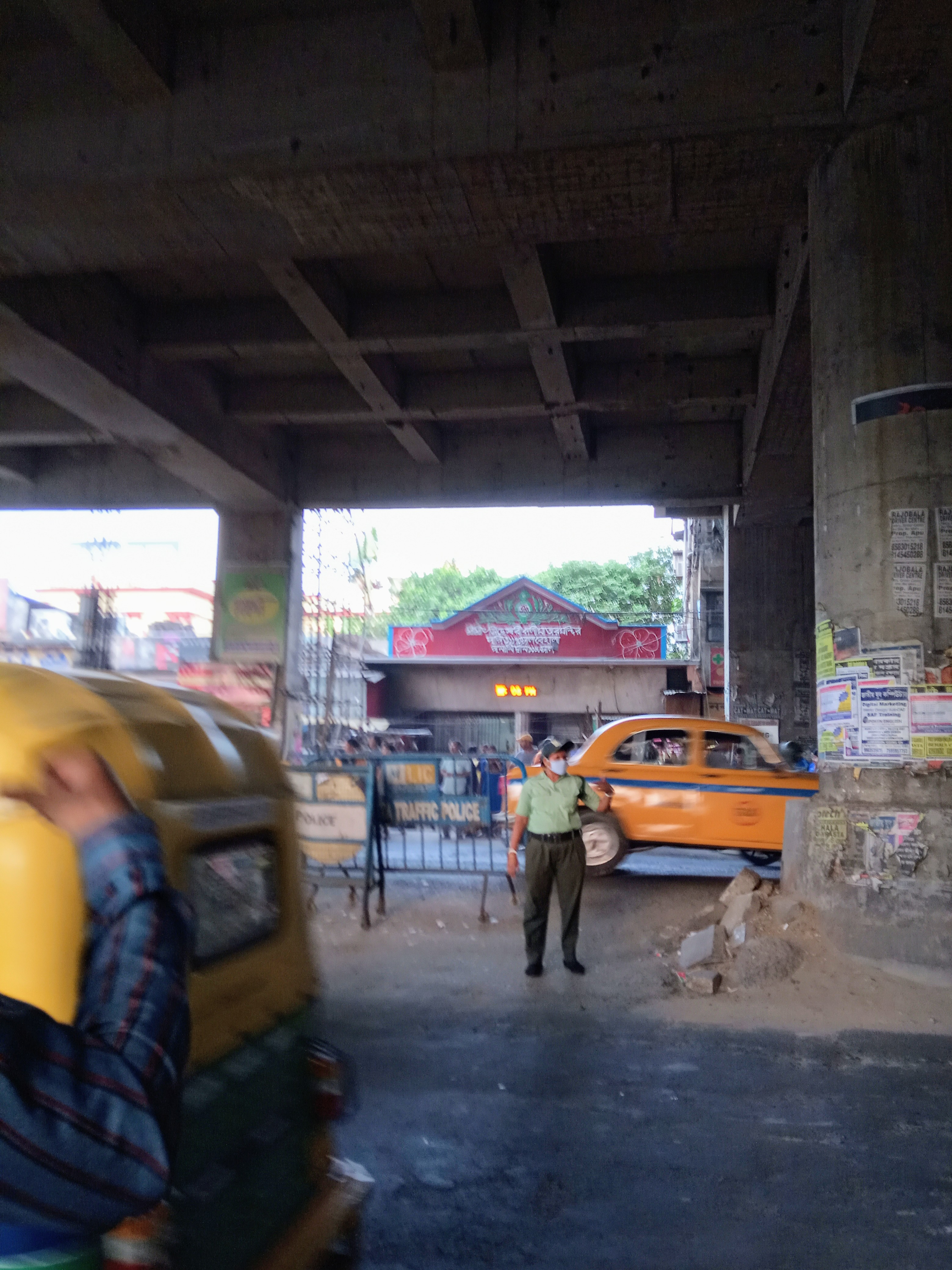
Siddheshwari temple of Behala

- Sonar Durga Temple, a location for Durga Puja festivities.
- Siddheshwari Kali Temple
- 72 Banamali Naskar Lane, Behala, Kolkata-60: The fictional address of Ghanashyam Das, the protagonist of the Bengali science fiction novel Ghanada.
- Sabarna Sangrahashala, Baro Bari, Barisha
- St. Peter's Church, Church of North India
