= Sarsuna =

- City
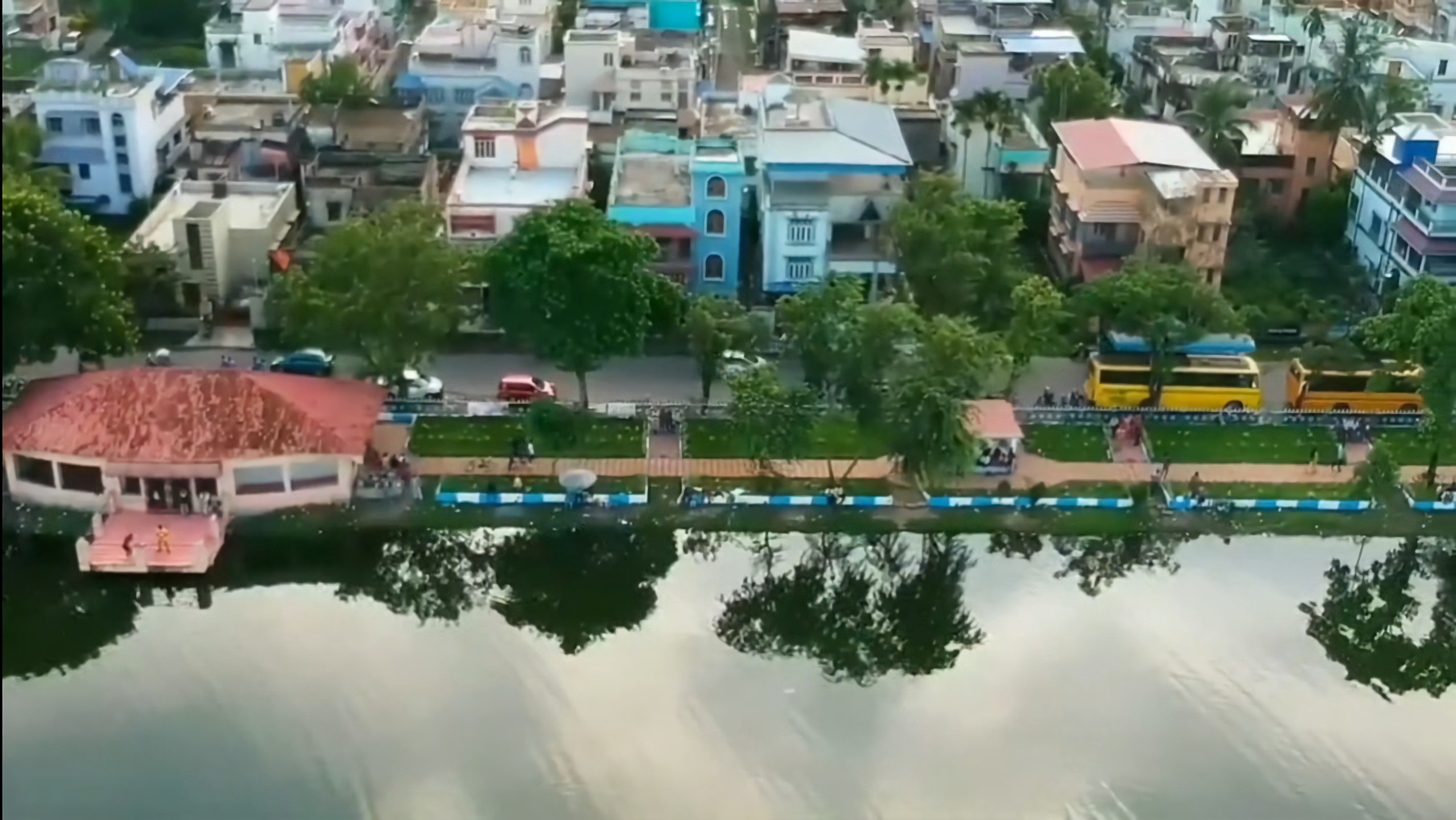
- Sarsuna Housing

- Location in West Bengal
- Coordinates: 22.484135°N 88.282694°E
- Country: India
- State: West Bengal
- City: Kolkata
- District: South 24 Parganas
- Municipal corporation: Kolkata Municipal Corporation
- KMC ward: 127, 126, 125

Population (2011)
  - Total: 43,782
- Time zone: UTC+5:30 (IST)
- PIN: 700 061
- Area code: +91 33
- Lok Sabha constituency: Kolkata Dakshin
- Vidhan Sabha constituency: Behala Paschim

Sarsuna is a locality of South Kolkata in South 24 Parganas district in the Indian state of West Bengal. It is a part of Behala region. It is located at the south-western fringe of the city and marks the limit of KMC area. Sarsuna is bordered by Barisha in the east and Maheshtala to the west.

== History ==
Behala was once a part of the Sunderbans. The history of Barisha dated back to the Pala Era. In the 12th century, Barisha was a small village of farmers, fishermen and honey-gathers when a Kulin Kayastha named Dhananjay Mitra settled here. During the reign of Akbar Barisha came under the lordship of Basanta Roy who set up his capital at modern-day Sarsuna. Roy's nephew and the king of Jessore Pratapaditya murdered him and incorporated Barisha with his kingdom. After the Mughals defeated Pratapaditya, Laksmikanta Majumdar of the Sabarna Roy Choudhury family was given jagirdari of a vast tract of land by Raja Man Singh in 1608. The three villages of Sutanuti, Govindapur and Kalikata were part of a khasmahal or imperial jagir or an estate belonging to the Mughal emperor himself, whose jagirdari rights were held by the Sabarna Roy Choudhury family. Even the Sabarna Roy Choudhury family was not keen to allow the British to settle or do trading on these villages, but the British had paid a bribe at the Mughal Durbar to ensure that the deal did not fail. Just prior to their move to Barisha, the Roy Choudhury family had to transfer their rights over Kalikata in 1698, to the East India Company much against their wishes and protests. Sabarna Atchala

The stretch of Diamond Harbour Road from Taratala to Thakurpukur is a very old settlement, which divides the Behala into three parts - East Behala, South Behala and West Behala. It is populated mostly by citizens of East-Bengal (Before Partition of India Bangladesh was called East Bengal) though traditionally it was primarily a West-Bengali ('ghoti' in Bengali) settlement.

Settlement in the area dates back to the 1797, but its urbanization is relatively recent. Population growth started in Behala after the partition of India.

The Sabarna Roychoudhury's 'Aath-chala' could be regarded as the most prominent historical structure (though mostly ruined presently) of the city of Kolkata. It is the structure, sitting under which the British East India Company signed the rights of the villages- Kalikata, Gobindapur and Sutanuti (which later merged to form the city of Calcutta), under a lease from the Sabarna Roy Choudhury family on 10 November 1698.

It is an area that was extremely rural prior to the 1972 Bangladesh war. During the war, scores of refugees from Bangladesh settled in this area. These refugees who became legal Indian citizens and form the bulk of the population in Sarsuna.

== Geography ==
Sarsuna is composed of many small localities like Mukherjee Para, Banarjee Para, Chatterjee Para, Ghosh Para, Das Para, Sonamukhi, Kashthadanga, Bakultala, Talpukur, Shakuntala Park, Shakuntala Housing Society, Shakuntala Park Satellite Township, Muchipara, Kethopole, Oxytown, Shibramapur, Chandrapally, Sarkar Hat, Basudevpur, Sarsuna Satellite Township, Jhautala, Raidighi, Parui Para, Khudiram Pally, Keshtor More, Bagpota, Debi Nagar, Shoshthir More, Anandanagar(Partially) etc.

=== Police district ===
Sarsuna police station is part of the South West division of Kolkata Police.

Behala Women police station covers all police districts under the jurisdiction of the South West division.

== Transport ==
=== CSTC ===
==== Ordinary Bus ====
- 3A/2 Sarsuna — Salt Lake Sector 5 (non-functional)
- 7 Howrah Station — Sarsuna via New Alipore (non-functional)
- 7A Howrah Station — Sarsuna via Khidderpore
- 7N Nabanna - Sarsuna via Hastings (non-functional)

==== Mini Bus ====
- M7D Sonamukhi Bazar — Kankurgachi
- M7E Bagpota — Howrah Station
- M7C Sastir More - Howrah Station

=== Private Bus ===
- 18A/1 Dakghar — Howrah Station (non-functional)
- 18C Kestor More — Anandapur
- 18D Surya Sen Nagar — Howrah Station

== Healthcare ==
Sarsuna Block Primary Health Centre at Sarsuna, with 15 beds is the major government medical facility for Thakurpukur Maheshtala CD block.
