= Thakurpukur =

Neighbourhood in Kolkata in West Bengal, India

- Neighbourhood in Kolkata (Calcutta)
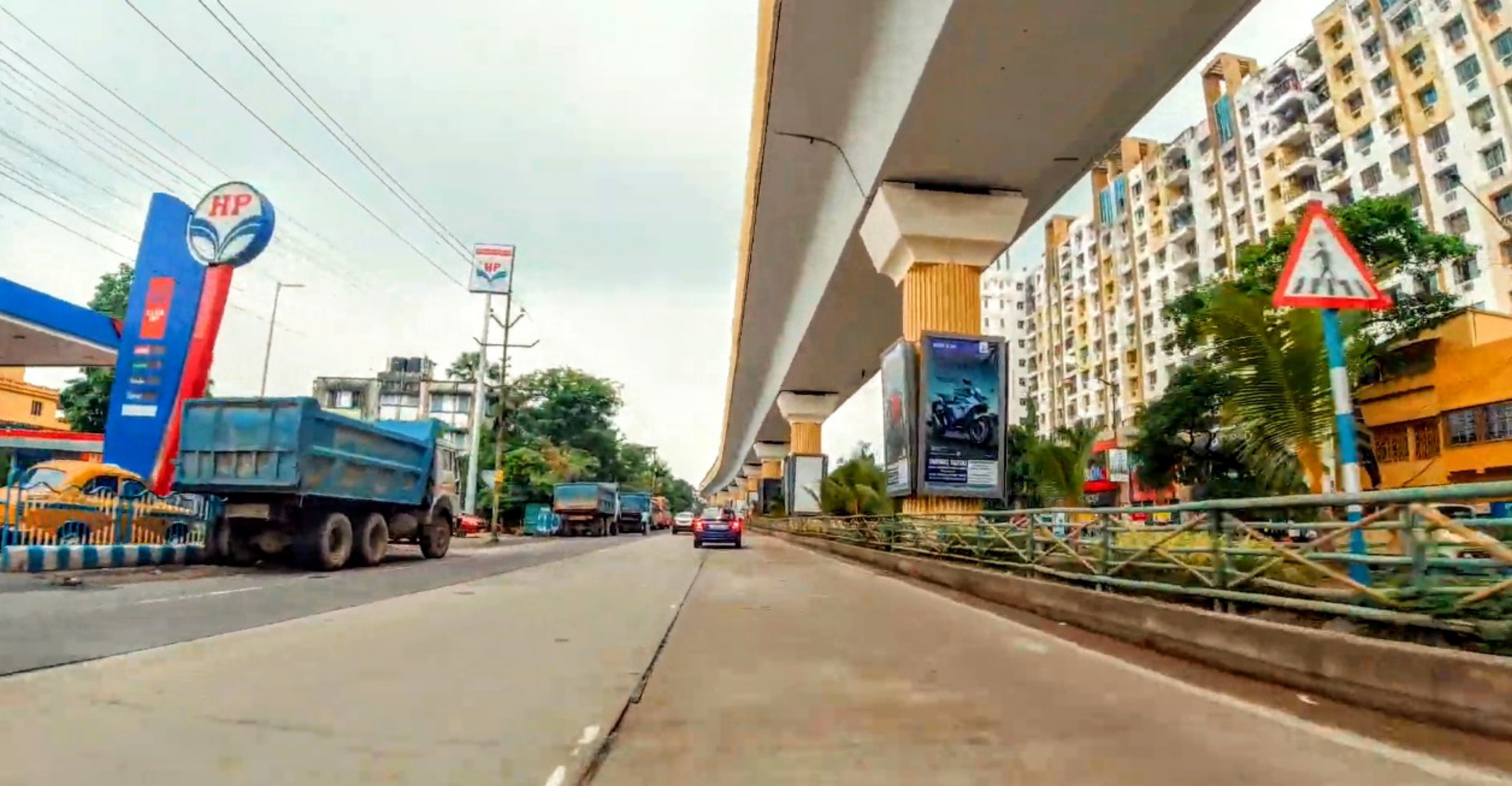
- Thakurpukur, D.H Road

- Location in Kolkata
- Coordinates: 22.465°N 88.307°E
- Country: India
- State: West Bengal
- City: Kolkata
- District: South 24 Parganas
- Metro Station: Thakurpukur
- Municipal Corporation: Kolkata Municipal Corporation
- KMC ward: 124,125

Population
  - Total: For population see linked KMC ward page
- Time zone: UTC+5:30 (IST)
- PIN: 700 063
- Area code: +91 33
- Lok Sabha constituency: Kolkata Dakshin
- Vidhan Sabha constituency: Behala Purba, Behala Paschim

Thakurpukur is a locality of South Kolkata in South 24 Parganas district in the Indian state of West Bengal. It is a part of Behala region. Thakurpukur was under Barisha area during Sabarna Roy Choudhury's zamindari era.

== Administration ==
=== Police district ===
Thakurpukur police station is part of the South West division (Behala Division) of Kolkata Police. It is located at 123/117, Diamond Harbour Road, Kolkata-700063.

Behala Women police station, located at the same address as above, covers all police districts under the jurisdiction of the South West division i.e. Sarsuna, Taratala, Behala, Parnasree, Thakurpukur, and Haridevpur.

Jadavpur, Thakurpukur, Behala, Purba Jadavpur, Tiljala, Regent Park, Metiabruz, Nadial, and Kasba police stations were transferred from South 24 Parganas to Kolkata in 2011. Except for Metiabruz, all the police stations were split into two. The new police stations are Parnasree, Haridevpur, Garfa, Patuli, Survey Park, Pragati Maidan, Bansdroni and Rajabagan.

== Education ==
Vivekananda College was established at Barisha in 1950 as Barisha College, renamed Vivekananda College in 1956 and shifted to Thakurpukur in 1959. Affiliated with the University of Calcutta, it offers honours courses in bengali, english, sanskrit, history, philosophy, political science, journalism & mass communications, physics, chemistry, mathematics, economics, botany, zoology, computer science, biochemistry, and environmental science.

Other Educational Institutions nearby are

1. Vivekananda College for Women
2. El Bethel School
3. M. P. Birla Foundation Higher Secondary School
4. Meghmala Roy Education Centre
5. Sarsuna College
6. Sarsuna Law College
7. National Gems Higher Secondary School
8. Barisha Purba Para High school
9. Barisha Vivekananda Boys High School
10. Barisha Vivekananda Girls High School
11. Gournagar High School
12. Bratachari Vidyasram

== Market ==
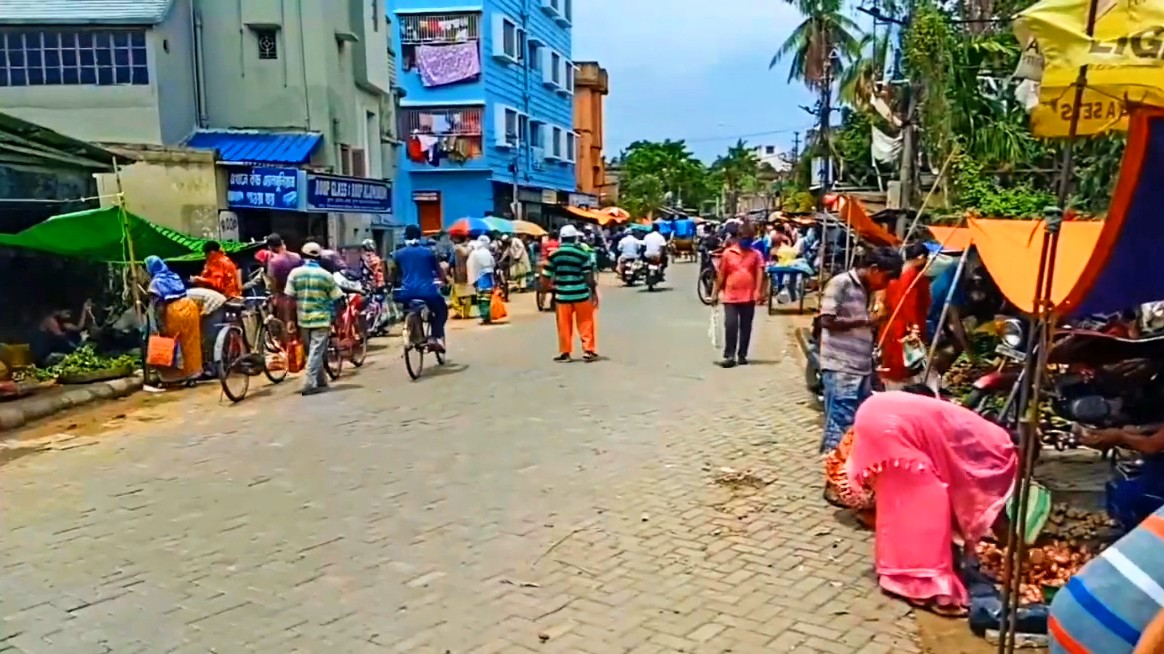
Thakurpukur Bazar, Bakhrahat Road

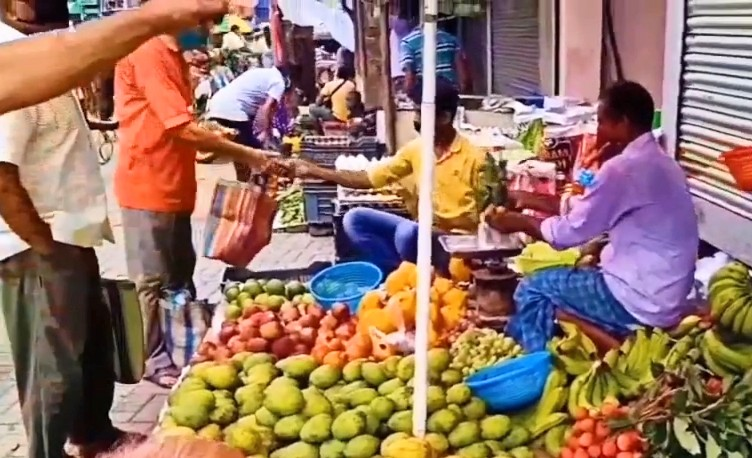
Fruits, Vegetables, Fish, Meat Market

Thakurpukur Bazar is a wide ranging market in South Kolkata. People sell vegetables, meat, fish, clothing, electronics, and gadgets.

== Healthcare ==
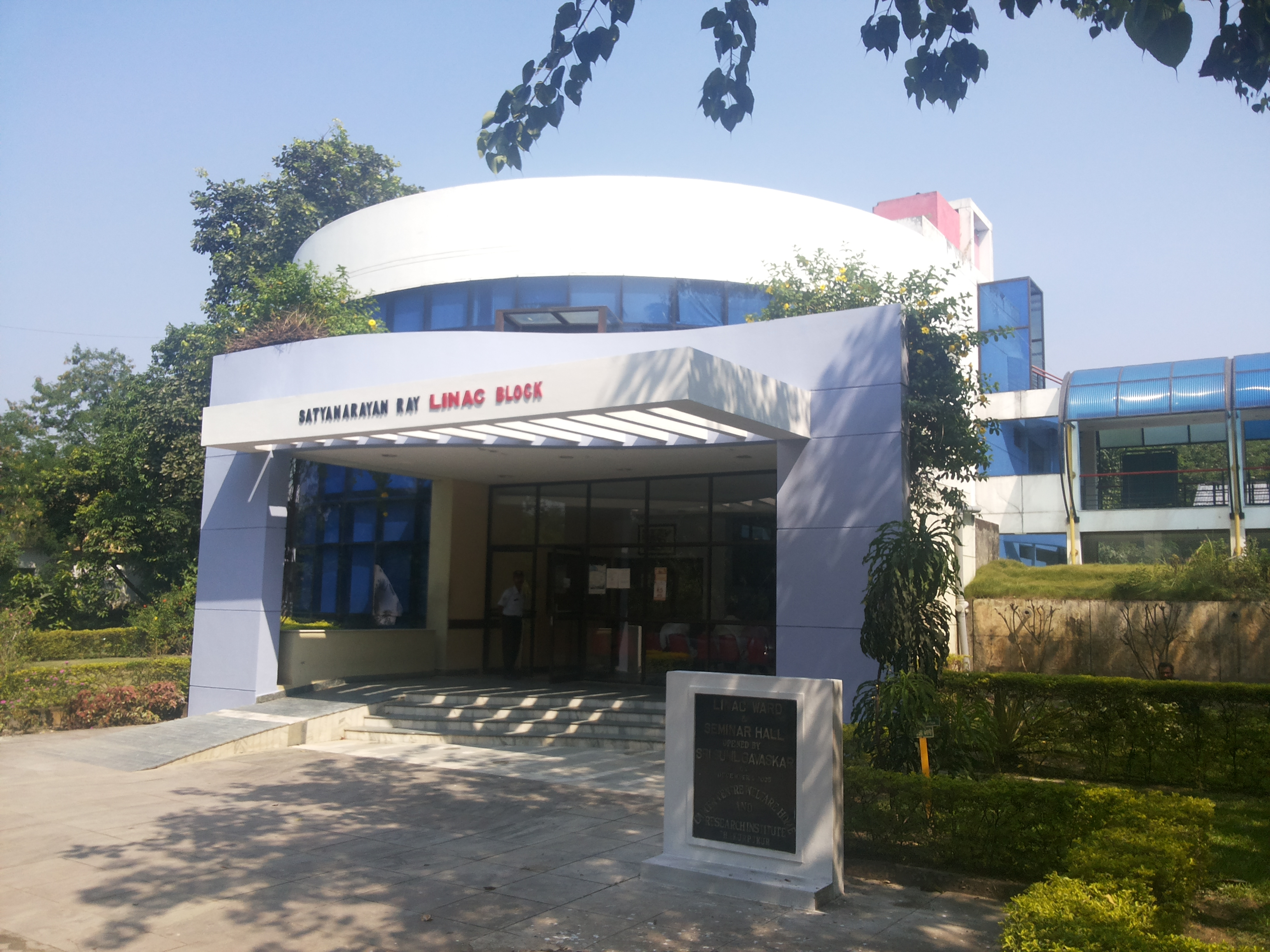
LINAC Block of SGCC&RI

One of the oldest cancer treatment centre of Kolkata is situated here as Saroj Gupta Cancer Centre and Research Institute, Which is located off the Mahatma Gandhi Road. The hospital is locally known as Thakurpukur Cancer Hospital. This hospital is one of the important landmark of this area.

Besides Cancer Hospital, many other hospitals and treatment centres are available here like D.M Hospital, Apollo Clinic, Swadesh Basu Hospital, BMRI Hospital, Kasturi Medical Centre, Advanced Neuropsychiatry Institute, Humanity Hospital etc.
