= Sabarna Roy Choudhury =

Zamindar Family in early British India

Sabarna Roy Choudhury was a Zamindar family of Mughal Bengal. They controlled significant swathes of territory, including what would later become Kolkata, prior to the sale of zamindari rights in 1698 to the East India Company.

== Zamindari ==
=== Establishment Legends ===
According to family tradition, Kamdev Brahmachari, born Jia Ganguly — the only heir of one Panchu Ganguly "Khan" — is the earliest scion about whom any significant information is available. They were a prominent land magnate based in Jessore; Jia left his holdings to be an ascetic at Benaras.

Jia apparently had Man Singh among his disciples — he not only taught him all the tricks of war but also provided tactical knowledge about quelling Pratapaditya of Bengal, a rebel vassal. However, Jia's son, Lakshmikanta Ganguly, who was deserted at his birth, served as the Chief Revenue Officer of Pratapaditya, complicating the affairs. Man Singh resolved the conundrum by having Lakshmikanta switch sides before subduing the rebellion c. 1613.

In return, the zamindari rights of multiple parganas — including but not limited to the three villages of Sutanuti, Govindapur and Dihi Kalikata — were granted to Lakshmikanta, who would adopt the surname of Roy Choudhury. (Note: Apparently, they were originally based in Halisahar but migrated to Gopalpore and Birati across the next two generations in tune with the increasing extents of reclaimed land.) These territories were still owned by the Mughal emperor but the right to governance and tax-collection, a major part of which was to be remitted to the Mughal Court, was ceded away with. (Note: It is disputed if the Zamindars exerted any ownership over their land. Farhat Hasan argues in favor.) The particular choice of lands is explained by asserting that the Gangulys were the traditional patrons of the Kalighat Kali.

==== Historical accuracy ====
Man Singh had never waged any war against Pratapaditya and hence, the background story concerning the receipt of Zamindari rights appears to be fictional. Beside, the factual authenticity of Roy Chowdhurys' being the traditional patrons of the deity is disputed. (Note: However, the current temple was indeed constructed by them in 1809 — a structure of unknown origin had existed before that, at-least for about a century.)

Notwithstanding the unclear circumstances governing their rise to the elite strata, the Roy Chowdhurys were one of the first Brahmin families of would-be Calcutta. However, they were not the first settlers in the region — Sutanuti was already a major wool-trading center where had flourished the Basak, Sett, and a group of Portuguese merchants. In Dihi Kalikata, Armenian traders commanded significant influence.

=== Relinquishment ===
Around early March 1698, the East India Company (EIC) proposed to the Roy Choudhurys that Dihi Kalikata be subrented to them. (Note: As early as 1697, the Court suggested such a transaction anticipating an increase in land value.) The offer was rejected since then-Zamindar (anon.) of the Roy Chowdhurys feared permanently losing the properties to a far-powerful client. This led the EIC to negotiate for the rent-rights outright and at the Mughal quarters; one Nathaniel Walsh was dispatched to Prince Azim-ush-Shan, then-Viceroy of Bengal Subah. The negotiations proved successful.

On 14 April, Walsh informed the Court about Azim-ush-Shan confirming an informal grant of Zamindari rights. (Note: As early as 1 April, the Company Court at Sutanuti had received a letter from Walsh noting the amenability of Azim-ush-Shan to the proposal, if paid a sum of 2000 Rupees in addition to the usual Zamindari fees.) However, it would be only around early July, that the nishaan would be signed by the Diwan Izzat Khan and sent to Azim-ush-Shan — the reason for delay being the multiple complains lodged by the Zamindar before Khan who ultimately granted a compensation of 1000 Rupees, of which half had to be borne by the Company. (Note: The Court had to prod Walsh (and even Azim-ush-ShanAzim-ush-Shan) several times — 20 May, 18 June — for quick issuance of nishaan, as they faced increasing difficulties in managing their settlements at Kalikata.) Around early July, Choudhury made a last-ditch effort at stalling the transfer by promising a sum of 6000 Rupees to Azim-ush-Shan but failed. On 1 August, three appropriately-stamped copies of nishaans were finally received; the zamindari rights, not only for Dihi Kalikata but also for Sutanuti and Govindapur, had been transferred to the Company but subsequent to them paying Choudhury another 1000 Rupees. (Note: The original copy of Azim-ush-Shan's nishaan has been lost since before 1917 and gauging the exact legal rights it conferred on the EIC remains difficult. From other records, it is clear that they had the right to collect taxes from subjects, deal with waste-lands to their wishes, and impose minor taxes and fines. However, they were forbidden from raising the land-taxes without consulting the Mughal administration. Some authors incorrectly deem the transaction to be a lease of the lands.)

The company started execution of the transfer in around October. Despite the presence of Mughal officials, the Choudhury proved unwilling to part with the lands and threatened to complaint Aurangzeb about Azim-ush-Shan's ways. So, the Company proposed to pay them an additional 500 Rupees, if they consented in writing about relinquishing all claims to the lands permanently. On 9 November 1698, the bainama (transfer-deed) was finally executed in tune with what the Company sought; the Choudhury sold all of their rights to Charles Eyre for a renegotiated sum of 1300 Rupees. On 3 February 1699, Diwan Khan issued a parwana declaring the transfer deed to be operative; thenceforth, the Mughals were to recognize the Company as the permanent taluqdars. (Note: This terminology can be confusing, if read against B. R. Grover's documentation of revenue structure in Bengal Subah: taluqdars and above them, the zamindars, who paid the Mughal exchequer with "group tax". A relic of Akbar's land policies, the differences between the two classes seem to have been minimal by Aurangzeb's time; the EIC certainly had no local overlord(s) and paid the taxes to Mughals.)

The Choudhurys moved to Barisha soon after the sale. This pioneer purchase of zamindari would become a keystone for the British ascendency in South Asia; within a century, the three villages merged with one another and other adjacent territories under the Company administration, to form the modern town of Calcutta, what would serve as the capital of British India till 1911.

==== Analysis ====
The transfer of Zamindari rights proved to be a deviation from the usual customs; prior, the Mughals had seldom bothered with negotiating the sale of zamindaris and usually gave the involved tax-farmers a free hand. This micromanagement is popularly attributed to the Company's showering of a variety of gifts on Azim-ush-Shan as well as his relatives and officials. However, the gifts — being mostly in the form of nazrana or peshkash — are not perceptible as bribes and were anyway too meager for the concessions decreed.

== Durga Puja ==
The Sabarna Roy Choudhurys were one of the earliest to hold the public festival of Durga Puja — apparently, in 1610.

== Museum ==
Sabarna Sangrahashala, a heritage museum in Kolkata is run by the family.
