= Barisha, Kolkata =

Barisha
- Neighbourhood in Kolkata (Calcutta)
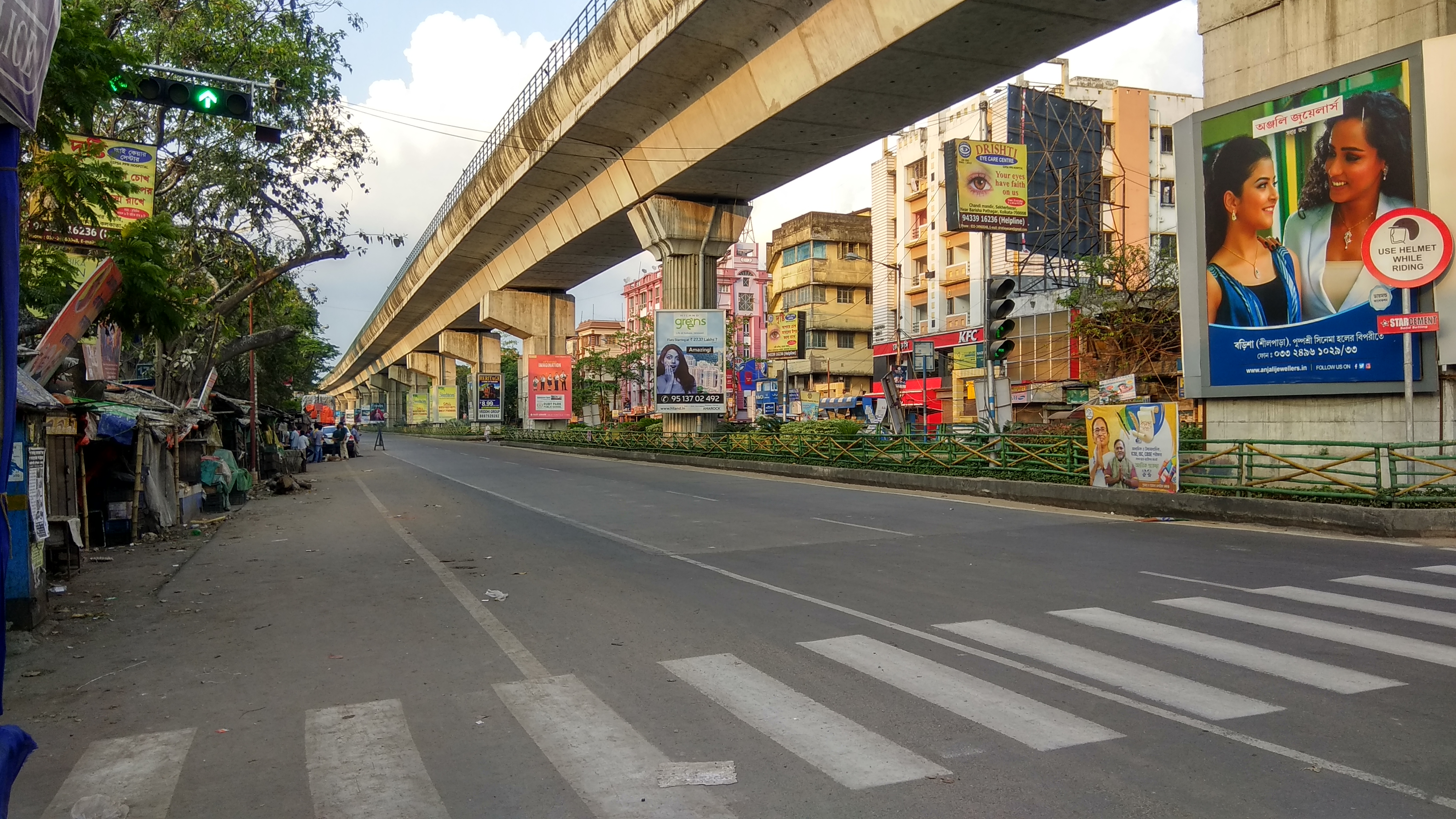
- Diamond Harbour Rd, Barisha

- Location in Kolkata
- Coordinates: 22.484847°N 88.313686°E
- Country: India
- State: West Bengal
- City: Kolkata
- District: South 24 Parganas
- Municipal Corporation: Kolkata Municipal Corporation
- KMC wards: 123, 124, 125, 126
- Time zone: UTC+5:30 (IST)
- PIN: 700008, 700063
- Area code: +91 33
- Lok Sabha constituency: Kolkata Dakshin
- Vidhan Sabha constituency: Behala Paschim and Behala Purba

Barisha is a residential and very old locality of South Kolkata in West Bengal, India. It is a part of Behala region and divided as Paschim Barisha and Purba Barisha.

== Location ==
Barisha is situated in the southwest of Kolkata about 10 kilometres (6 mi) from the city centre Esplanade. The Barisha area is composed of Behala Chowrasta, Janakalyan, Silpara, Sakherbazar and Thakurpukur.

The area borders Behala Manton towards north, Joka towards south, Sarsuna and Dakshin Behala toward West, and Haridevpur, Siriti, Tollygunge towards east.

== Durga puja in Barisha ==
There are several clubs in and around Barisha that organize Durga Puja every year. Barisha Club in Santosh Roy Road, State Bank Park Sarbojonin in Thakurpukur East Barisha Govt. Colony, Barisha Jagrihi Women's Welfare Association etc. are some of the clubs that organize Durga Puja. Durga Puja held at the home of the Saborno Roy Chowdhury family is one of the oldest Durga Pujas being performed in India every year.

== See also ==
- History of Kolkata
