= New Alipore =

- Neighbourhood in Kolkata (Calcutta)
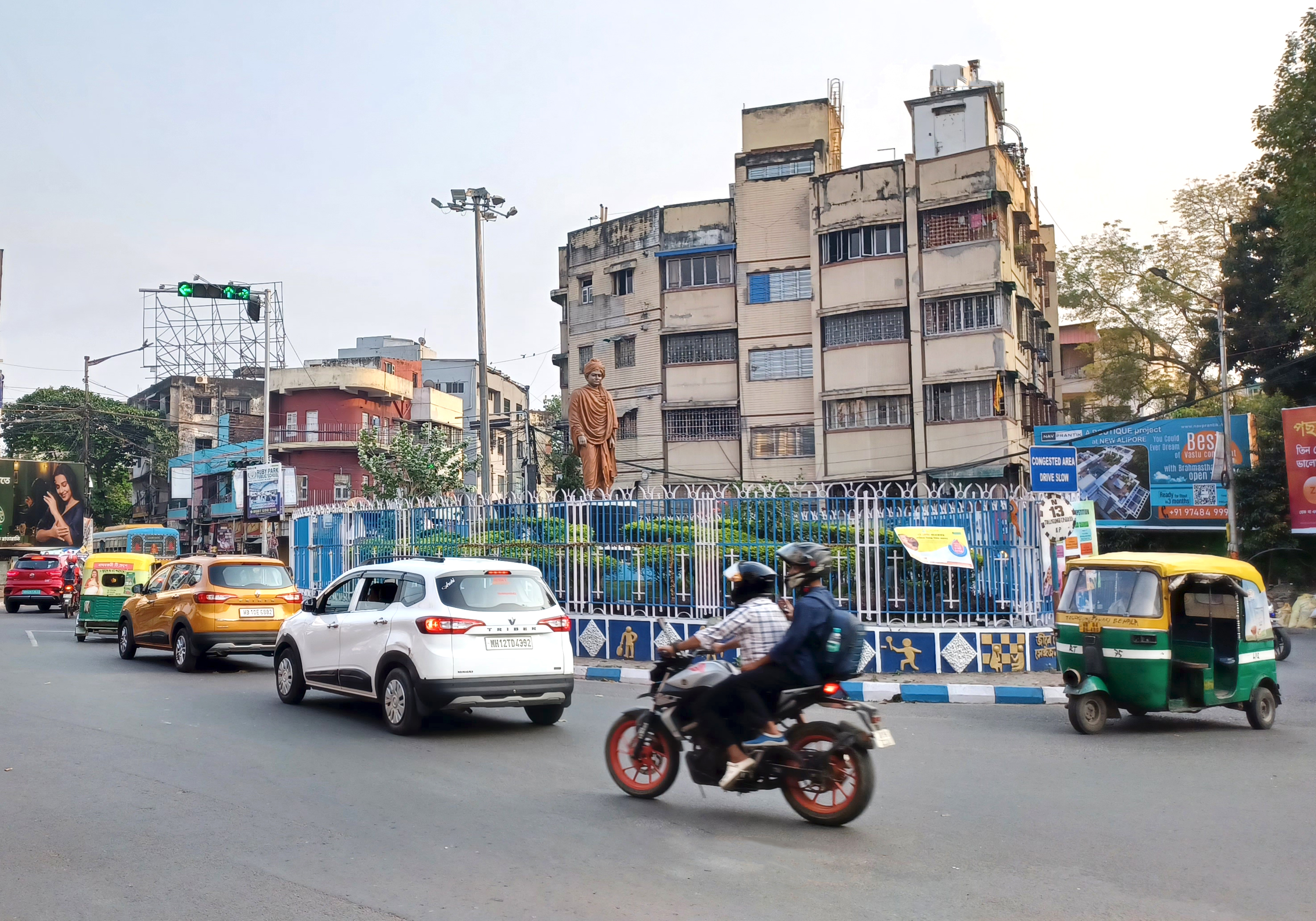

- Location in Kolkata
- Coordinates: 22.51°N 88.32°E
- Country: India
- State: West Bengal
- City: Kolkata
- District: Kolkata
- Railway stations: New Alipore railway station and Majerhat railway station
- Metro Station: Majerhat and Taratala
- Municipal Corporation: Kolkata Municipal Corporation
- KMC ward: 81, 118, 119
- Elevation: 15 m (49 ft)

Languages
  - Official: Bengali, English
- Time zone: UTC+5:30 (IST)
- PIN: 700053, 700038
- Telephone code: 91-33
- Lok Sabha constituency: Kolkata Dakshin
- Vidhan Sabha constituency: Rashbehari and Behala Paschim

New Alipore is an upscale and standard locality of South Kolkata in Kolkata district in the Indian state of West Bengal.

== Description ==
=== Geography ===
New Alipore is bordered on the north by the Budge Budge section of the Kolkata Suburban Railway between Majerhat and Tollygunge stations. It is bounded by B.L. Saha Road (Chetla) to the east, Diamond Harbour Road to the west and by Behala to the south.

=== History ===
New Alipore was created as a planned residential suburb of Kolkata by the Kolkata Metropolitan Development Authority in the 1950s to house the burgeoning population of the city.

New Alipore was already the location of the India Government Mint, built in the 1930s. Next to the mint lies the Centenary Port Trust Hospital, built in 1971.

=== Transport ===
New Alipore has two railway stations, New Alipore railway station and Majerhat railway station on the Budge Budge section of the Kolkata Suburban Railway and Kolkata Circular Railway.

New Alipore is connected to all parts of the city by extensive bus services. The Diamond Harbour Road is part of NH 117. The erstwhile Kalighat Falta Railway (KFR) has been dismantled and the space reclaimed. The stretch where once the tracks lay is now the James Long Sarani. This road runs parallel to the Diamond Harbour Road and through Behala and Thakurpukur.

=== Police district ===
New Alipore is served by New Alipore police station: it is part of the South division of Kolkata Police. Tollygunge Women's police station has jurisdiction over all the police districts in the South Division.

=== Institutions ===
There are many renowned educational institutions in New Alipore : New Alipore College, NAAC accredited "A" grade college, St. Joseph & Mary's School, St. Thomas Institution, Moople - Institute of Animation and Design, Dream Institute of Technology, CMC Computer education Centre, National Institute of Information Technology, IMEI Kolkata, CADD Centre, P C Chandra Medical College, Ruprit Educare, Digital WebGurukul, Professional Institute of Wellness Studies & Research, SIP ABACUS New Alipore, TALLY ACADEMY-NEW ALIPORE, MiraTech Solutions,

== Gallery ==
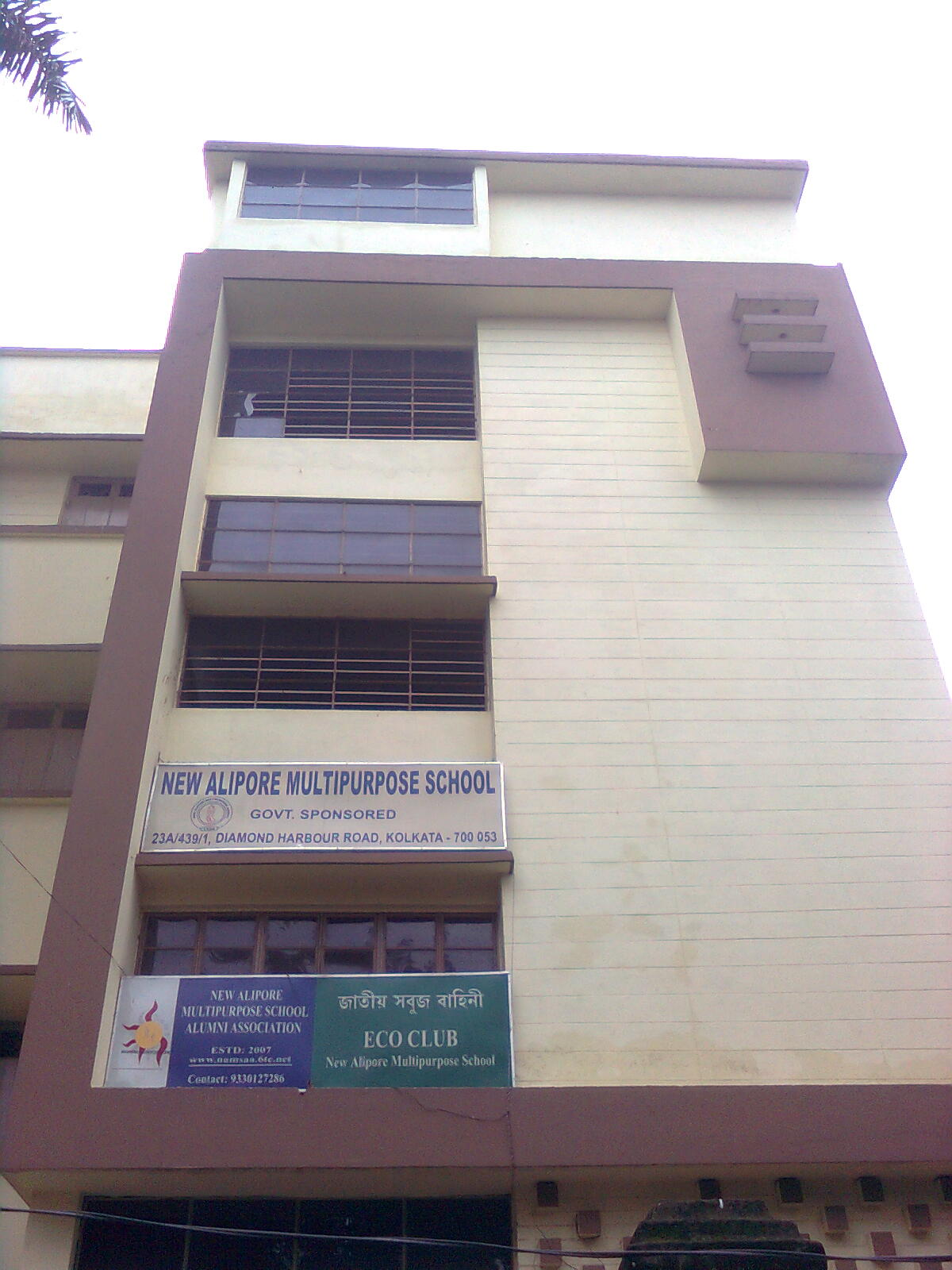
New Alipore Multipurpose School Front View

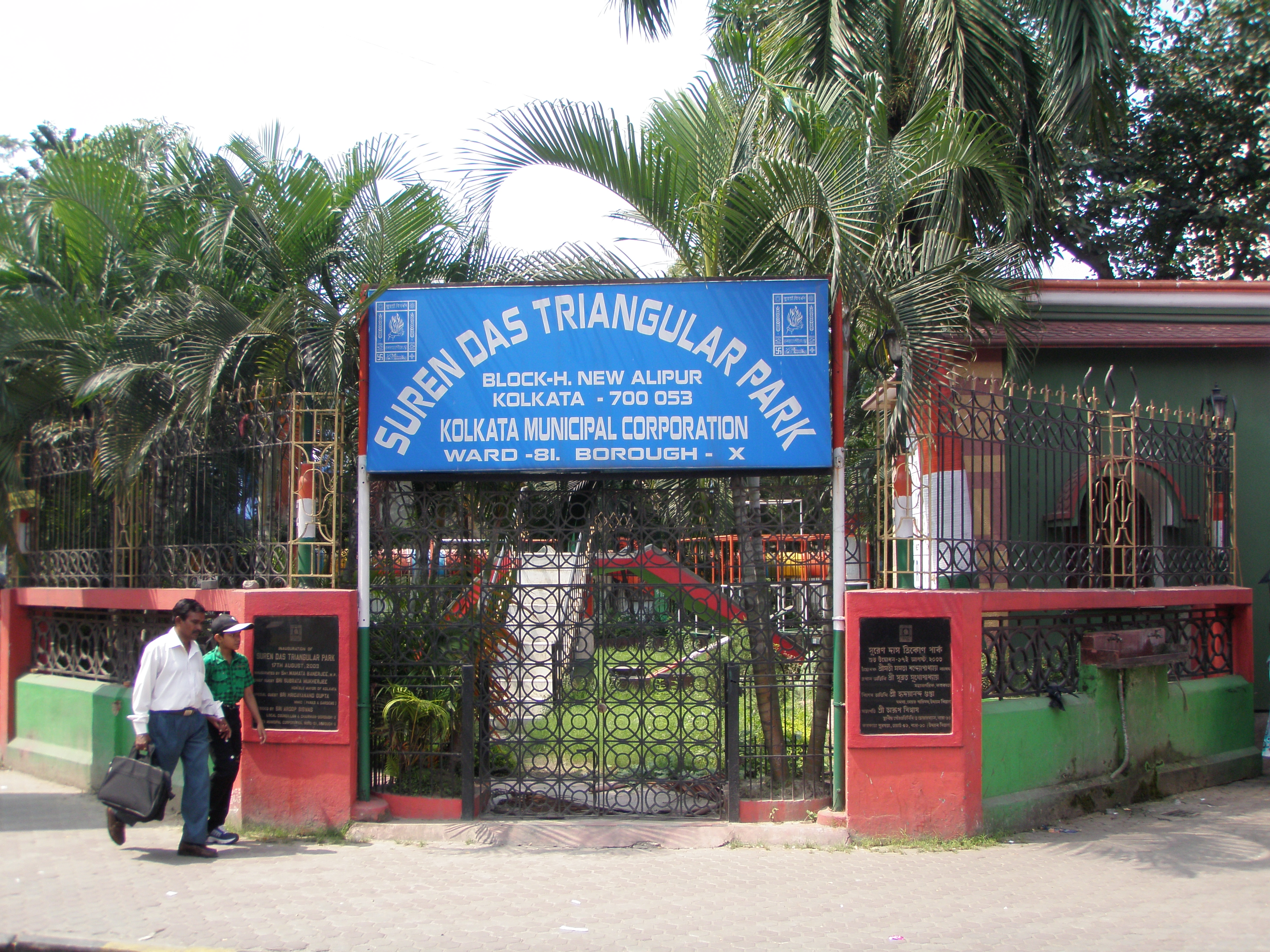
Triangular Park, New Alipore

== See also ==
- Category:People from New Alipore

== Notable people ==
- Tapan Sinha
