= Khidirpur (disambiguation) =

Khidirpur refers to Kidderpore, a neighbourhood in Kolkata, West Bengal, India

It also refers to:

- Kidderpore College, Kidderpore, Kolkata, West Bengal, India
- Kidderpore SC, a soccer club in Kidderpore
- Khidirpur metro station, a Kolkata metro station in Kidderpore
- Khiddirpur railway station, a railway station in the Kolkata Suburban Railway system
- Khidirpur, Murshidabad, a census town in Murshidabad district, West Bengal, India
- Kshidirpur, a census town in Nadia district, West Bengal, India
- Khiddirpur, a village in Ayodhya district, Uttar Pradesh, India
