= Gwalior Monument =

Gwalior Monument, Kolkata গোয়ালিয়র স্মৃতি-সৌধ
- Ellenborough’s Folly, or The Pepperpot
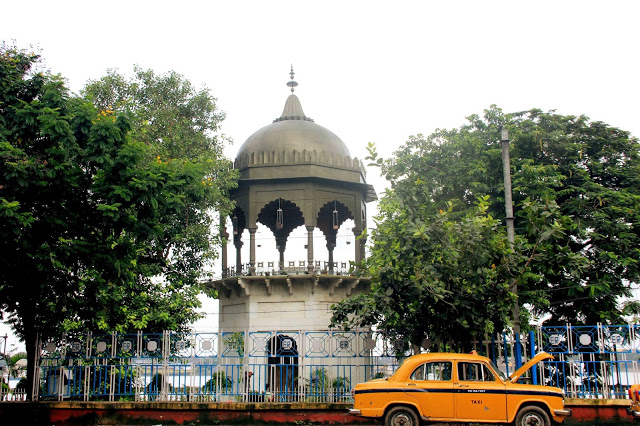
- Gwalior Monument along the Hoogly riverfront, Kolkata
- Interactive map of Gwalior Monument, Kolkata গোয়ালিয়র স্মৃতি-সৌধ
- Location: Strand Road, Kolkata, West Bengal, India
- Coordinates: 22°33′38″N 88°20′02″E
- Designer: Colonel H. Goodwyn
- Type: Cenotaph
- Material: Bronze dome with white marble base
- Height: 18 m (60 ft)
- Opening date: 1847
- Dedicated to: The officers and men of the British Troops who fell during the Gwalior campaign in 1843

The Gwalior Monument, also known as Ellenborough's Folly, or The Pepperpot, is an octagonal cenotaph about 18 metres (60 ft) high, crowned with a bronze dome cast from guns captured from the Scindia forces. It was erected in 1847 by Lord Ellenborough, the Governor-General of India, as a memorial to the officers and men who fell during the Gwalior War in 1843. It had been vandalized over the years and was restored by INTACH, The Indian National Trust for Art and Cultural Heritage in 1990.

== History ==
The Scindia Dynasty was an independent and formidable force in Central India in mid 19th century with large french based modernized army.

After the death of Jankoji Rao Scindia, on 7th February 1843, a succession crises began in Gwalior state. A child named Bhagirath (later known by his regnal name Jayajirao Scindia) was placed on the throne but the court became divided between different factions.Tara Bai Scindia (commonly known as Tara Scindia) supported one faction that included Jayajirao Scindia as minor), second faction of nobles were supporting Dada Khasgiwala, an unscrupulous adventurer who wished to get all power into his own hands and on the other hand the British wanted a regency favorable to them. Lord Ellenborough, Governor General of India, feared that Gwalior might challenge British authority in North and Central India. He strategised to curb Scindia's military power in Central India. He wrote a letter to the Maharani Tara Scindia of Gwalior warning her that she should dismiss a usurping regent and that the size of her army should be reduced. Maharani Tara resisted and did not comply, which triggered the Gwalior Campaign by the British East India Company.

Gen. Sir Hugh Gough, violating the treaty of 1804 with Gwalior, forded the Chambal river and invaded the city, which was known for its grand palaces and riches, on 29th day of December 1843. The Gwalior War at Maharajpura was fought under Sir Hugh and major general Churchill with 14,000 men and 40 guns against the Gwalior State under commander in chief Appa Sahib with 25,000 men and 150 guns. On the battlefield the British suffered a humongous loss of 2000 casualties including the death of General Churchill. The Maharani Scindia lost 4000 men and 56 guns. On the same day at Punniar, 30 kilometres (20 mi) from Maharajpura, the left flank of Gough's troops under General Grey routed an army of 12,000 of the Gwalior State and captured 40 guns.

== Design and architecture ==
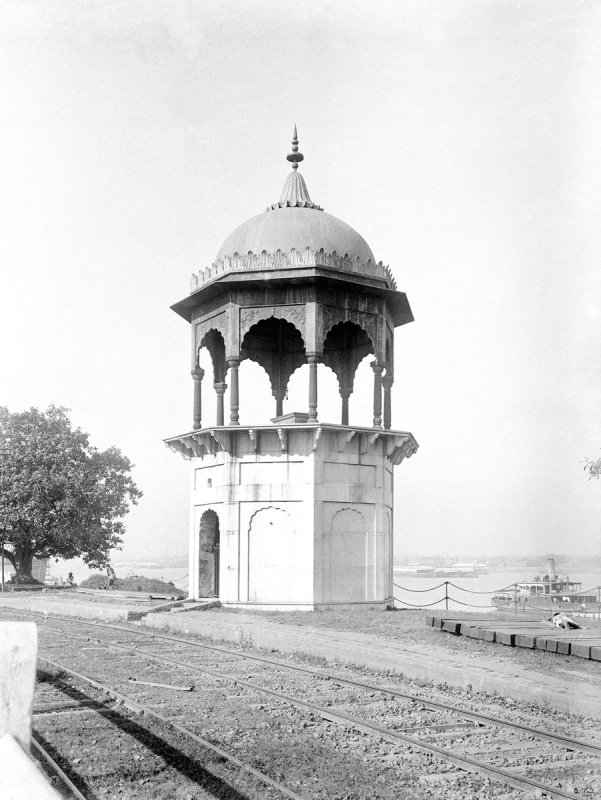
Gwalior Memorial, Calcutta (Kolkata) - c1912-14

It was designed by Colonel H Goodwyn of the Bengal Engineers and constructed by Jessop and Company. It was conceptualised by Lord Ellenborough. The base is a single storied white marble structure with a spiral staircase leading to a marble cenotaph on the upper floor from the inside. The top of the monument is built like a Mughal 'chhatri' or umbrella supported by 8 bronze pillars. The dome of the cenotaph is crowned with a bronze dome cast from guns captured from the Marathas. From here, the Hoogly river can be seen along with a view of the Howrah Bridge and the Vidyasagar Setu. However entry is restricted. The Kolkata Circular Railway passes alongside the memorial between the Eden Gardens and Prinsep Ghat railway stations, and provides a view of this monument.

== See also ==
- Victoria Memorial (India)
- Lascar War Memorial
- Shaheed Minar, Kolkata
