= New Alipore railway station =

Railway station in West Bengal, India

New Alipore
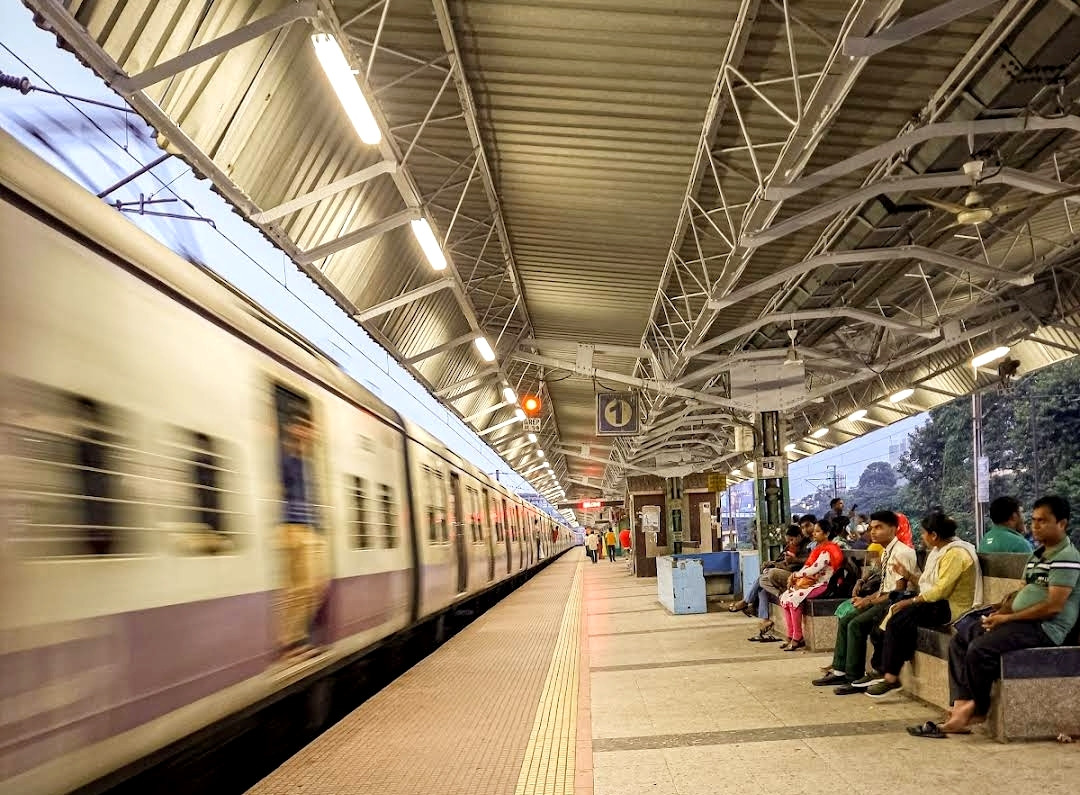

General information
- Location: New Alipore, Kolkata, West Bengal 700053; India
- Coordinates: 22.510456°N 88.335348°E
- Elevation: 9 metres (30 ft)
- System: Kolkata Suburban Railway Station
- Owner: Indian Railways
- Operator: Eastern Railway
- Lines: Budge Budge Branch line Kolkata Circular line
- Platforms: 2
- Tracks: 6

Construction
- Structure type: Standard (on-ground station)
- Parking: Not Available
- Cycle facilities: Not Available
- Accessible: Not Available

Other information
- Status: Functioning
- Station code: NACC
- Zone(s): Eastern Railway
- Division(s): Sealdah

History
- Opened: 1890; 136 years ago
- Electrified: 1965–1966; 60 years ago
- Former names: Eastern Bengal Railway
Services
Preceding station	Kolkata Suburban Railway	Following station
Majerhat towards Budge Budge	Sealdah South Budge Budge Branch line	Tollygunge towards Sealdah
Majerhat towards Dum Dum Junction	Circular Line	Tollygunge towards Dum Dum Junction
Route map
Location

New Alipore (Calcutta) railway station is a Kolkata Suburban Railway Station on the Budge Budge Branch line. It is under the jurisdiction of the Sealdah railway division in the Eastern Railway zone of the Indian Railways. It serves the local area of New Alipore in Kolkata in the Indian state of West Bengal.

== History ==
In 1890, the Eastern Bengal Railway constructed a 1,676 mm (5 ft 6 in)-wide broad-gauge railway from Ballygunge Junction to Budge Budge via New Alipore.

== Electrification ==
Electrification from Ballygunge Junction to Budge Budge including New Alipore was completed with 25 kV AC overhead system in 1965–66.

== Station complex ==
The platform is very much well sheltered. The station possesses many facilities including water and sanitation. There is a proper approach road to this station.
