= Park Circus (disambiguation) =

Park Circus is a neighbourhood of central-east Kolkata, in Kolkata district, West Bengal, India.

Park Circus may also refer to:

- Park Circus railway station, in the neighbourhood
- Park Circus (company), a Scottish film distribution company
- Park Circus, Glasgow, a street in Park District, Glasgow, Scotland
