= Tollygunge railway station =

Railway station in West Bengal, India

Tollygunge
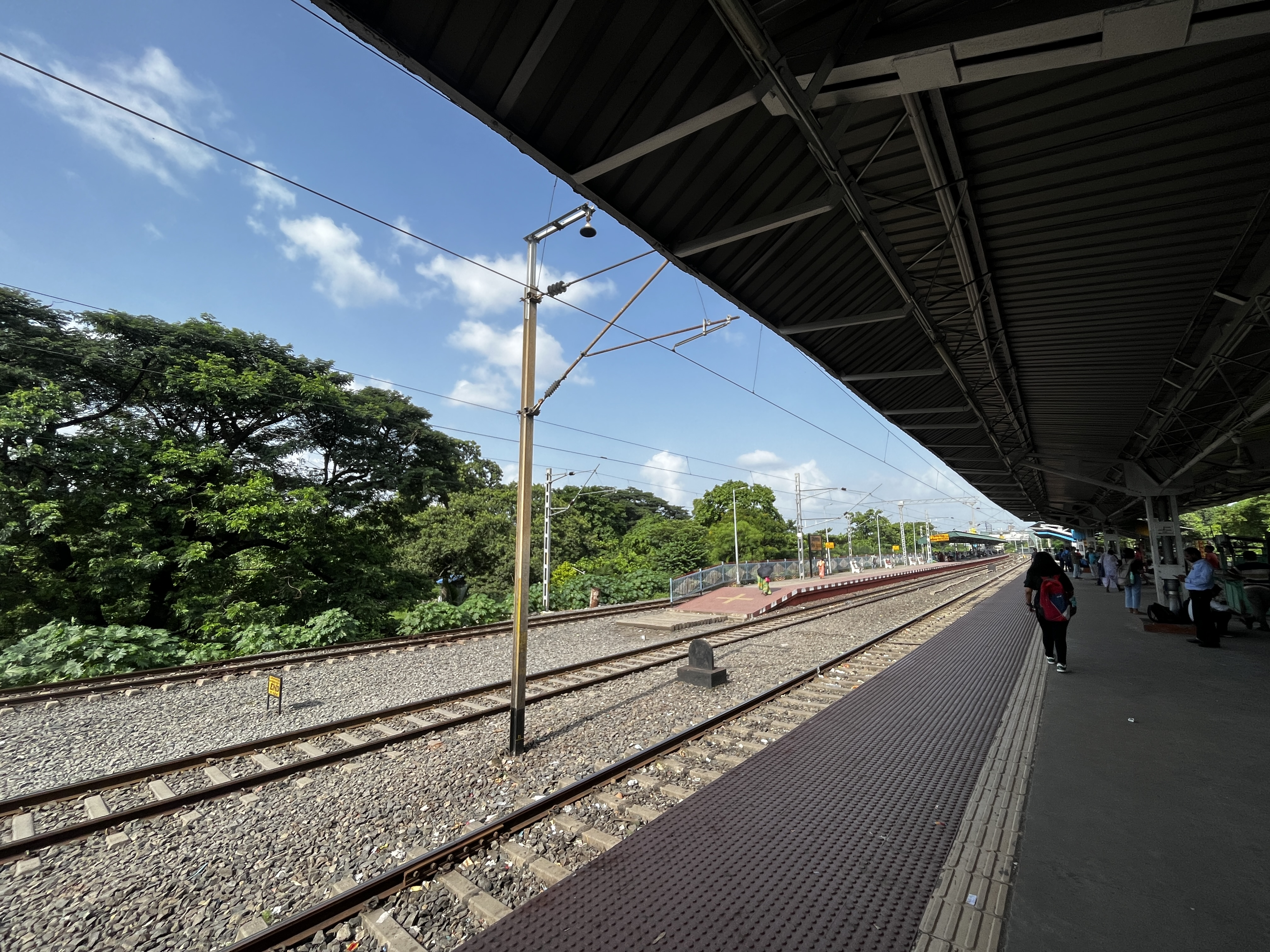

General information
- Location: Tollygunge, Kolkata, West Bengal 700033; India
- Coordinates: 22.507720°N 88.347243°E
- Elevation: 9 metres (30 ft)
- System: Kolkata Suburban Railway Station
- Owner: Indian Railways
- Operator: Eastern Railway
- Lines: Budge Budge Branch line Kolkata Circular line
- Platforms: 2
- Tracks: 3
- Connections: Rabindra Sarobar

Construction
- Structure type: Standard (on-ground station)
- Parking: Not Available
- Cycle facilities: Not Available
- Accessible: Not Available

Other information
- Status: Functioning
- Station code: TLG
- Zone(s): Eastern Railway
- Division(s): Sealdah

History
- Opened: 1990; 36 years ago
- Electrified: 1965–1966; 60 years ago
- Former names: Eastern Bengal Railway
Services
Preceding station	Kolkata Suburban Railway	Following station
New Alipore towards Budge Budge	Sealdah South Budge Budge Branch line	Lake Gardens towards Sealdah
New Alipore towards Dum Dum Junction	Circular Line	Lake Gardens towards Dum Dum Junction
Route map
Location

Tollygunge railway station is a Kolkata Suburban Railway Station on the Budge Budge Branch line. It is under the jurisdiction of the Sealdah railway division in the Eastern Railway zone of the Indian Railways. It serves the local area of Tollygunge in Kolkata in the Indian state of West Bengal.

== History ==
In 1890, the Eastern Bengal Railway constructed a 1,676 mm (5 ft 6 in)-wide broad-gauge railway from Ballygunge Junction to Budge Budge via Tollygunge.

== Electrification ==
Electrification from Ballygunge Junction to Budge Budge including Tollygunge was completed with 25 kV AC overhead system in 1965–66.

== Station complex ==
The platform is very much well sheltered. The station possesses many facilities including water and sanitation. There is a proper approach road to this station. This station is directly connected to Rabindra Sarobar metro station of the Blue line of the Kolkata metro.
