= Tala, Kolkata =

Tala
- Neighbourhood in Kolkata (Calcutta)
- Tala Water Tank

- Location in Kolkata
- Coordinates: 22.611889°N 88.381694°E
- Country: India
- State: West Bengal
- City: Kolkata
- District: Kolkata
- Metro Station: Shyambazar and Belgachia
- Municipal Corporation: Kolkata Municipal Corporation
- KMC ward: 5

Population
  - Total: For population see linked KMC ward pages
- Time zone: UTC+5:30 (IST)
- PIN: 700037
- Area code: +91 33
- Lok Sabha constituency: Kolkata Uttar
- Vidhan Sabha constituency: Kashipur-Belgachhia

Tala is a neighbourhood in North Kolkata in Kolkata district in the Indian state of West Bengal.

== History ==
The East India Company obtained from the Mughal emperor Farrukhsiyar, in 1717, the right to rent from 38 villages surrounding their settlement. Of these 5 lay across the Hooghly in what is now Howrah district. The remaining 33 villages were on the Calcutta side. After the fall of Siraj-ud-daulah, the last independent Nawab of Bengal, it purchased these villages in 1758 from Mir Jafar and reorganised them. These villages were known en-bloc as Dihi Panchannagram and Tala was one of them. It was considered to be a suburb beyond the limits of the Maratha Ditch.

== Geography ==
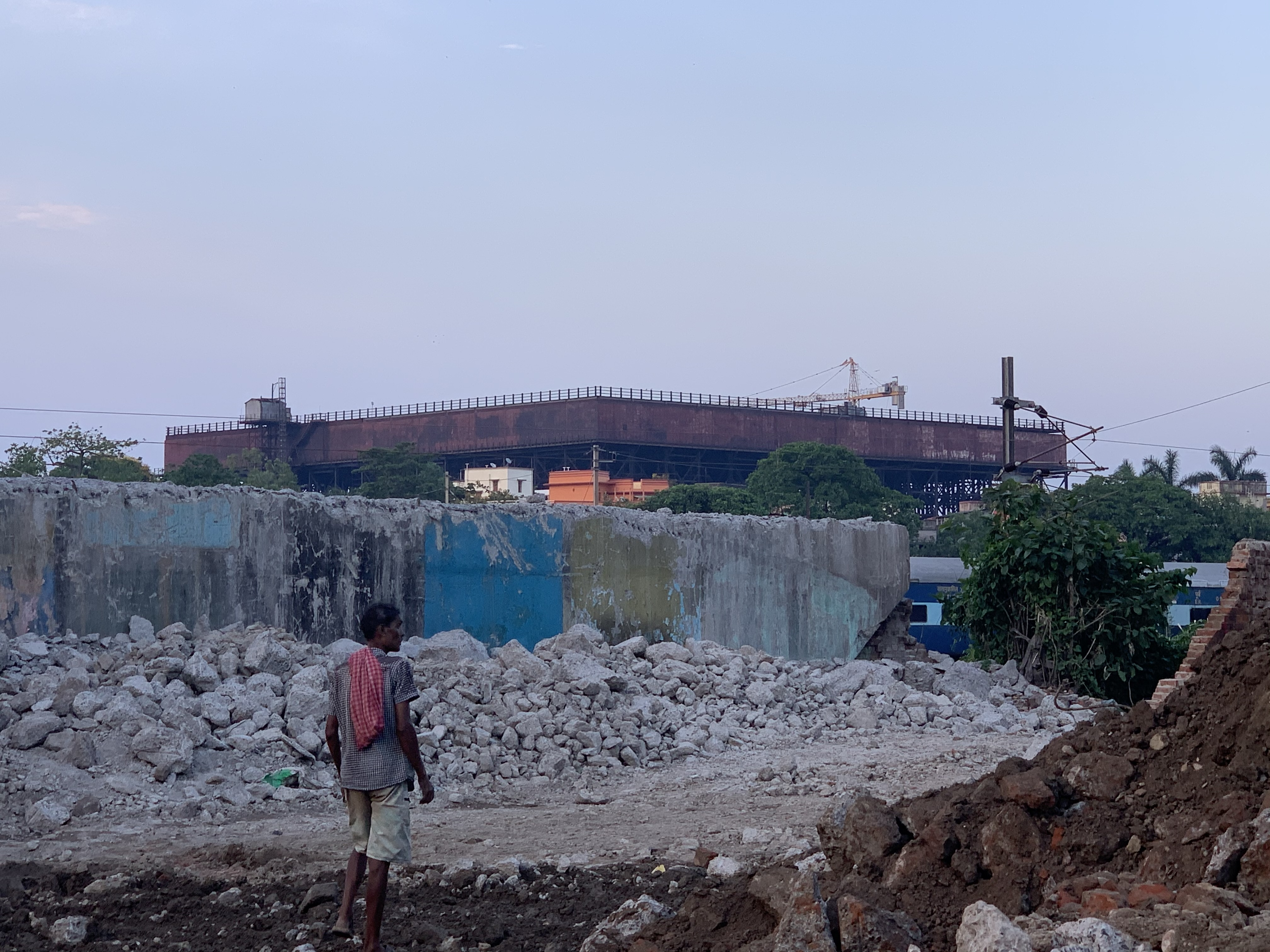
Tala Water Tank

Tala is adjacent to Shyambazar and Belgachia. Barrackpore Trunk Road passes on the western boundary of Tala. Tala railway station on Kolkata Circular Railway line serves the locality. Kolkata Station, one of the major railway hub stations of the city, is also located nearby.

=== Police district ===
Tala police station is part of the North and North Suburban division of Kolkata Police. Located at 4, Indra Biswas Road, Kolkata-700037, it has jurisdiction over Tala, Paikpara and Belgachia neighbourhoods/ Ward nos. 3, 4 and 5 of Kolkata Municipal Corporation.

Amherst Street Women police station covers all police districts under the jurisdiction of the North and North Suburban division i.e. Amherst Street, Jorabagan, Shyampukur, Cossipore, Chitpur, Sinthi, Burtolla and Tala.

=== Tala water tank ===
Tala water tank of Kolkata Municipal Corporation was built in 1909. It has the capacity to hold 9 million gallons of water and is the largest overhead reservoir in the world. It has a height of 110 feet.
