= Remount Road railway station =

Railway station in West Bengal, India

Remount Road

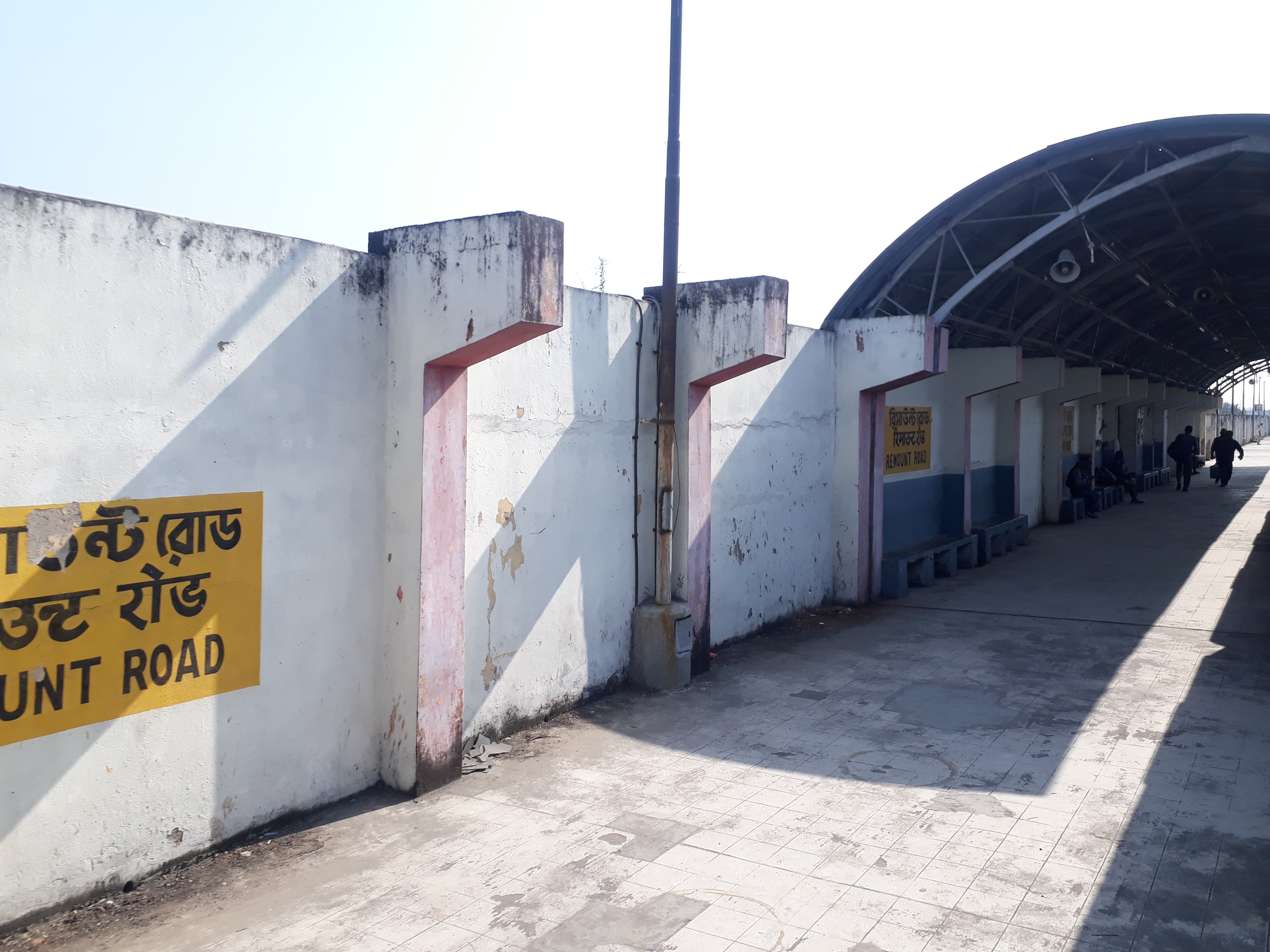
- Remount Road railway station platform

General information
- Location: Mominpur, Kolkata, West Bengal; India
- Coordinates: 22.525956°N 88.316661°E
- Elevation: 9 metres (30 ft)
- System: Kolkata Suburban Railway station
- Owner: Indian Railways
- Operator: Eastern Railway
- Line: Kolkata Circular line of Kolkata Suburban Railway
- Platforms: 1
- Tracks: 1

Construction
- Structure type: Elevated
- Parking: Available
- Cycle facilities: Not available
- Accessible: Available

Other information
- Status: Functioning
- Station code: RMTR
- Zone(s): Eastern Railway
- Division(s): Sealdah

History
- Opened: 1995; 31 years ago
- Electrified: 1995; 31 years ago
Services
Preceding station	Kolkata Suburban Railway	Following station
Khiddirpur towards Dum Dum Junction	Circular Line	Majerhat towards Dum Dum Junction
Route map
Location

Remount Road railway station is a Kolkata Suburban Railway station adjacent to Mominpore in Kolkata, West Bengal, India. It serves local areas of Remount Road, Mominpur, Khiddirpur and the Calcutta Dockyard areas. Only a few local trains halt here. The station has only a single platform. Its station code is RMTR.

== Station complex ==
The platform is very much well sheltered. The station possesses many facilities including water and sanitation. It is well connected to the Remount Road in Khidderpore. There is a proper approach road to this station.

=== Station layout ===
G	Street level	Exit/Entrance & ticket counter
P1	Side platform, No-1 doors will open on the left/right
P1	Track 1	Khiddirpur ← toward → Majerhat

== See also ==
- North 24 Parganas district
- Indian Railways
- Sealdah railway station
- Kolkata Suburban Railway
- Dum Dum Cantonment railway station
- Transport in West Bengal
- List of railway stations in India
