= Tala railway station =

Railway station in West Bengal, India

Tala

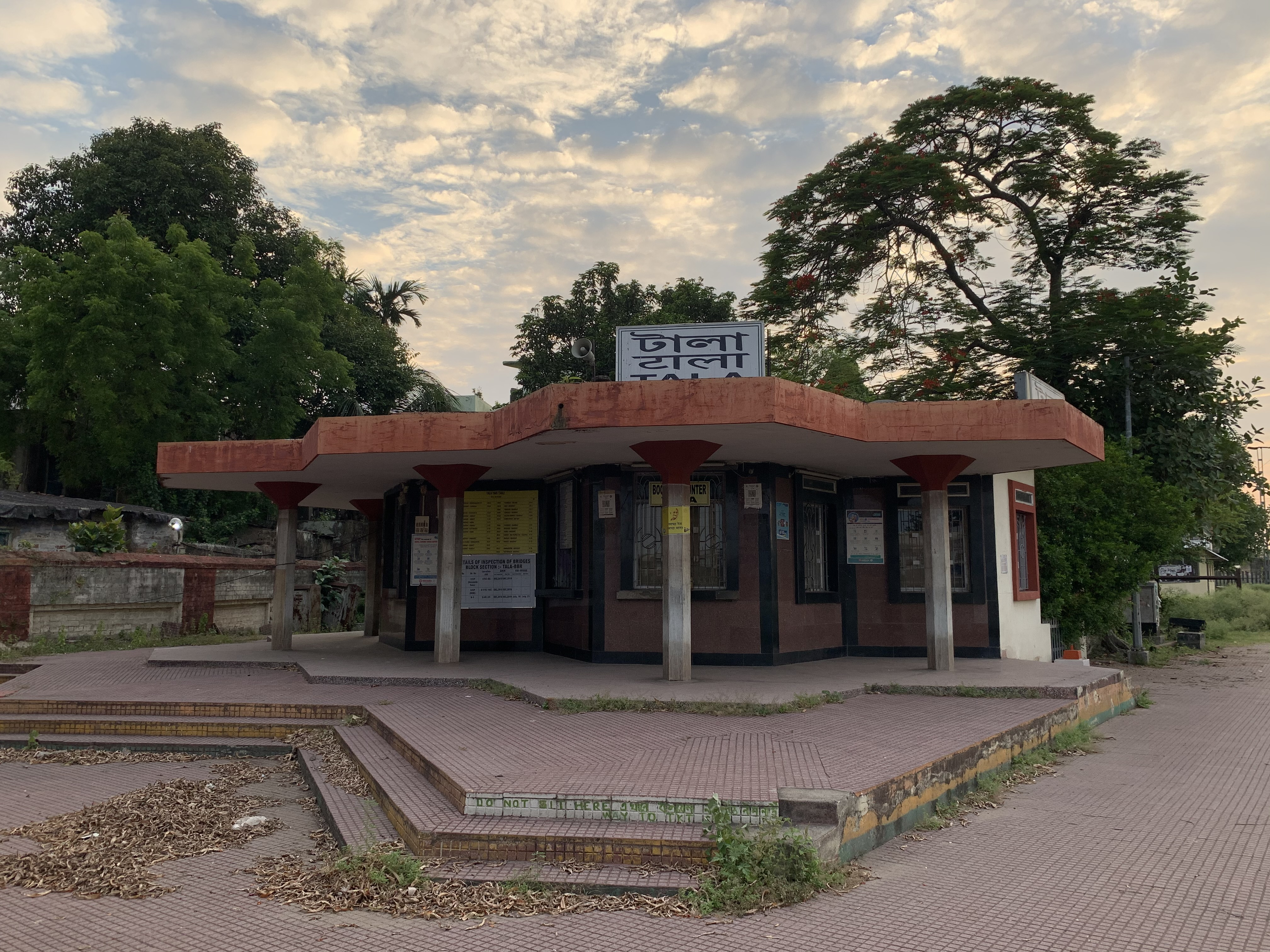

General information
- Location: Tala, Kolkata, West Bengal; India
- Coordinates: 22.606107°N 88.378622°E
- Elevation: 6 metres (20 ft)
- System: Kolkata Suburban Railway station
- Owner: Indian Railways
- Operator: Eastern Railway
- Platforms: 2
- Tracks: 2

Construction
- Structure type: At grade
- Parking: Not available
- Cycle facilities: Not available
- Accessible: Yes (via Belgachia fltyover)

Other information
- Status: Functioning
- Station code: TALA
- Zone(s): Eastern Railway
- Division(s): Sealdah

History
- Opened: 1984; 42 years ago
- Electrified: 1984; 42 years ago
Services
Preceding station	Kolkata Suburban Railway	Following station
Kolkata towards Dum Dum Junction	Circular Line	Bagbazar towards Dum Dum Junction
Route map
Location

Tala is a Kolkata Suburban Railway station in Tala, Kolkata. The station, which features two platforms, primarily functions as a freight yard, with only a few local trains making stops. Its station code is TALA.

== Station ==
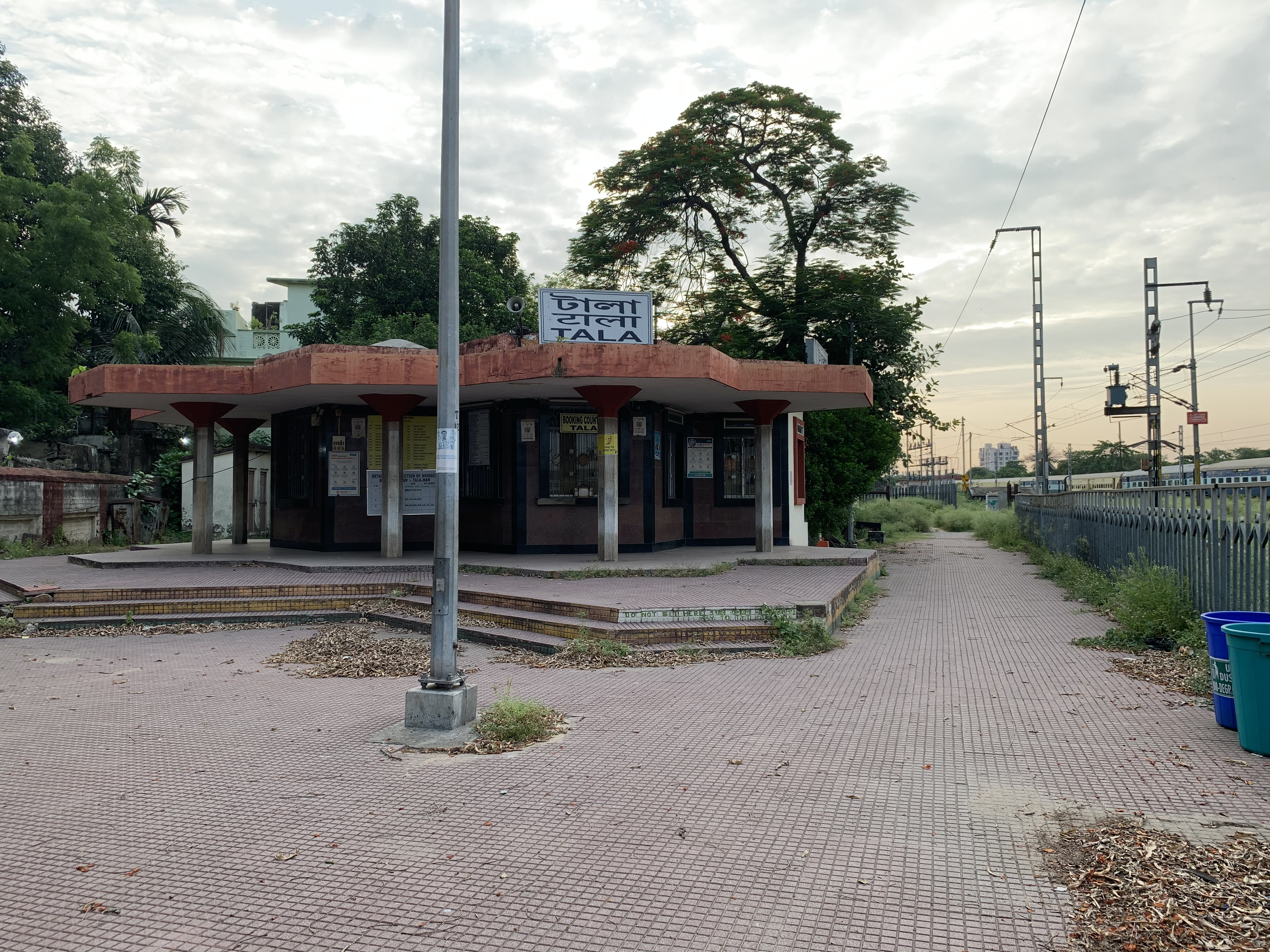
Tala Station

=== Complex ===
The platform is not very well sheltered. The station lacks many facilities including water and sanitation. There is no proper road for approaching this station.

== Connections ==
=== Bus ===
Bus route number 3, 3B, 3C/1, 3C/2, 3D, 3D/1, 30A, 30B, 30B/1, 30C, 30D, 32A, 34B, 34C, 43/1, 47B, 78, 78/1, 79B, 91, 91A, 93, 201, 202, 211A, 214, 214A, 215/1, 219, 219/1, 222, 227, 230, 234, 234/1, 237/1, DN18, KB16, KB22, K1, K4, JM2, JM4, 007, 7 (Mini), S158 (Mini), S159 (Mini), S160 (Mini), S161 (Mini), S164 (Mini), S168 (Mini), S180 (Mini), S181 (Mini), S185 (Mini), S189 (Mini), C11, C45, C50, D4/1, D11, D23, E14, E19D, E32, E51, EB1, EB1A, M34, MX1, MX2, MX3, S9A, S10, S11, S12C, S15G, S21, S32, S32A, S45, S56, S57, S58, T8, 11A, 33, AC2B, AC17B, AC20, AC35, AC40, AC54 serve the station.

=== Metro ===
Shyambazar metro station and Belgachia metro station are located nearby.
