= Lake Gardens railway station =

Railway Station in Kolkata, India

Lake Gardens
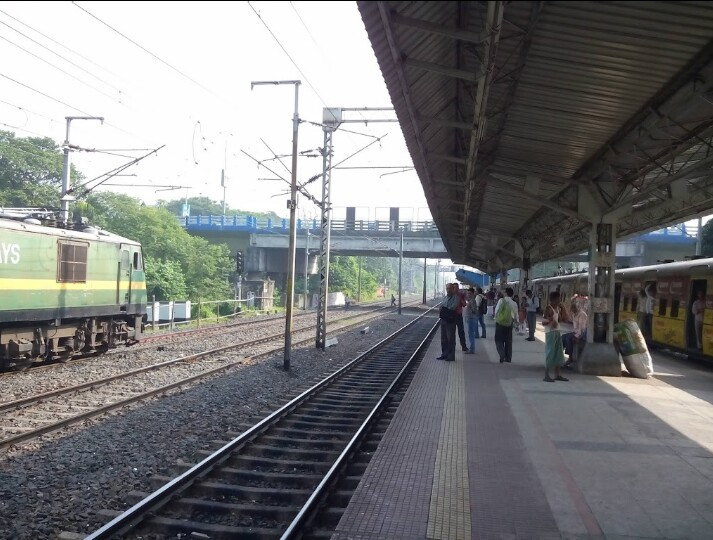
- Lake Gardens Railway Station

General information
- Location: Lake Gardens, Kolkata, West Bengal 700045; India
- Coordinates: 22.508037°N 88.353298°E
- Elevation: 9 metres (30 ft)
- System: Kolkata Suburban Railway Station
- Owner: Indian Railways
- Operator: Eastern Railway
- Lines: Budge Budge Branch line Kolkata Circular line
- Platforms: 2
- Tracks: 4

Construction
- Structure type: Standard (on-ground station)
- Parking: Not Available
- Cycle facilities: Not Available
- Accessible: Not Available

Other information
- Status: Functioning
- Station code: LKF
- Zone(s): Eastern Railway
- Division(s): Sealdah

History
- Opened: 2001; 25 years ago
- Electrified: 1965–1966; 60 years ago
- Former names: Eastern Bengal Railway
Services
| Preceding station | Kolkata Suburban Railway | Following station |
|---|---|---|
| Tollygunge towards Budge Budge | Sealdah South Budge Budge Branch line | Ballygunge Junction towards Sealdah |
| Tollygunge towards Dum Dum Junction | Circular Line | Ballygunge Junction towards Dum Dum Junction |
Route map
Location

Lake Gardens railway station is a Kolkata Suburban Railway Station on the Budge Budge Branch line. It is under the jurisdiction of the Sealdah railway division in the Eastern Railway zone of the Indian Railways. It serves the local area of Lake Gardens in Kolkata in the Indian state of West Bengal.

== History ==
In 1890, the Eastern Bengal Railway constructed a 1,676 mm (5 ft 6 in)-wide broad-gauge railway from Ballygunge Junction to Budge Budge via Lake Gardens.

== Electrification ==
Electrification from Ballygunge Junction to Budge Budge including Lake Gardens was completed with 25 kV AC overhead system in 1965–66.

== Station complex ==
The platform is very well sheltered. The station possesses many facilities including water and sanitation. There is a proper approach road to this station.
