= Prinsep Ghat railway station =

Railway station in Kolkata, India

Prinsep Ghat

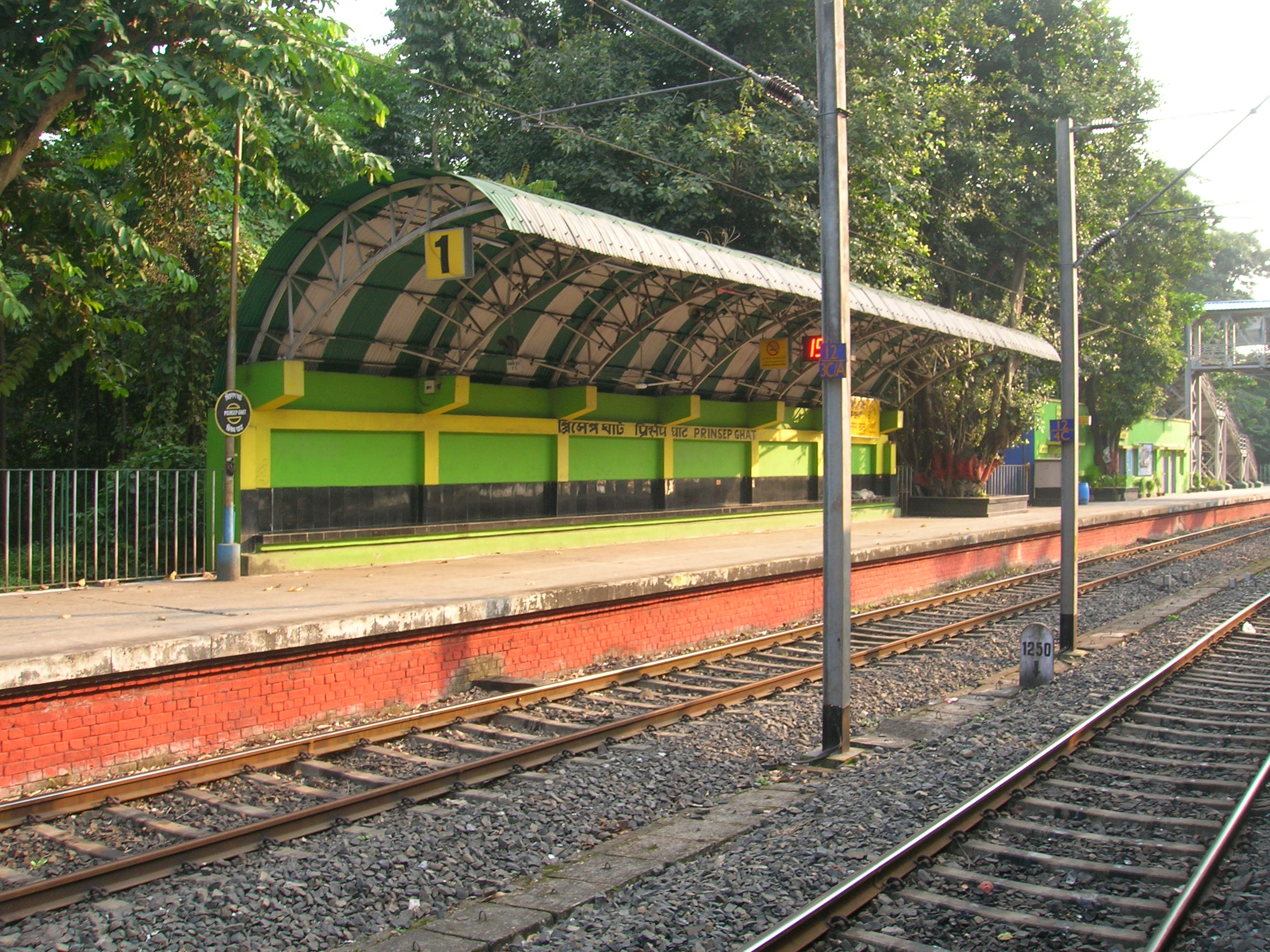
- Prinsep Ghat railway station

General information
- Location: Strand Road, Kolkata, West Bengal; India
- Coordinates: 22.557012°N 88.331681°E
- Elevation: 7 metres (23 ft)
- System: Kolkata Suburban Railway station
- Owner: Indian Railways
- Operator: Eastern Railway
- Platforms: 2
- Tracks: 2

Construction
- Structure type: At grade
- Parking: Not available
- Cycle facilities: Not available
- Accessible: Not available

Other information
- Status: Functioning
- Station code: PPGT
- Zone(s): Eastern Railway
- Division(s): Sealdah

History
- Opened: 1984; 42 years ago
- Electrified: 1984; 42 years ago
Services
| Preceding station | Kolkata Suburban Railway | Following station |
|---|---|---|
| Eden Gardens towards Dum Dum Junction | Circular Line | Khiddirpur towards Dum Dum Junction |
Route map
Location

Prinsep Ghat railway station is a Kolkata Suburban Railway station adjacent to James Prinsep Memorial in Kolkata, West Bengal, India. Only a few local trains halt here. The station has two platforms. Its station code is PPGT.

== Station complex ==
The platform is not very well sheltered. The station lacks many facilities including water and sanitation. It is well connected to the Strand Road. There is a proper approach road to this station.

=== Station layout ===
| G | Street level | Exit/Entrance |
| P1 | Side platform No- 1, doors will open on the left |
| P1 | | Towards →Khiddirpur→ → |
| P1 | | →Towards ←Eden Gardens← ← |
| P1 | Side platform No- 2, doors will open on the left |
| P2 |

== Connections ==
=== Ferry ===
The station is adjacent to Prisnep ghat. One can easily avail ferry services from there.

=== Airport ===
Netaji Subhash Chandra Bose International Airport is 23.6 km from the station via Strand Road, Acharya Jagdish Chandra Bose Road, Maa Flyover, EM Bypass and VIP Road.

== See also ==
- North 24 Parganas district
- Indian Railways
- Sealdah railway station
- Kolkata Suburban Railway
- Dum Dum Cantonment railway station
- Transport in West Bengal
- List of railway stations in India
