= Bagbazar railway station =

Railway station in Kolkata, India

Bagbazar
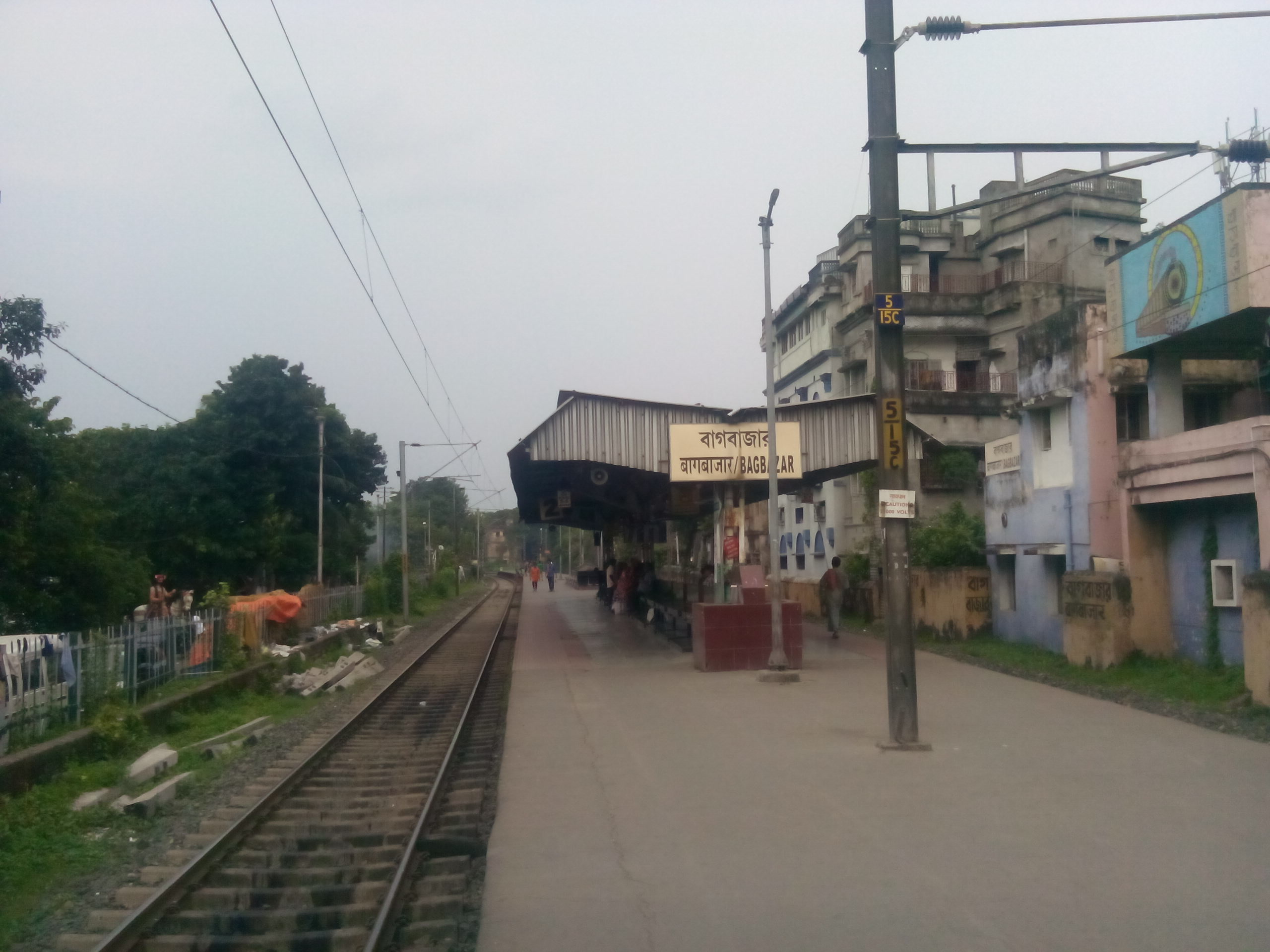
- Bagbazar railway station

General information
- Location: Bagbazar, Kolkata, West Bengal; India
- Coordinates: 22.605057°N 88.365149°E
- Elevation: 8 metres (26 ft)
- System: Kolkata Suburban Railway
- Owner: Indian Railways
- Operator: Eastern Railway
- Platforms: 2
- Tracks: 2
- Connections: Bagbazar Launch Ghat

Construction
- Structure type: At grade
- Parking: Not available
- Cycle facilities: Not available
- Accessible: Not available

Other information
- Status: Functioning
- Station code: BBR
- Zone(s): Eastern Railway
- Division(s): Sealdah

History
- Opened: 1984; 42 years ago
Services
| Preceding station | Kolkata Suburban Railway | Following station |
|---|---|---|
| Tala towards Dum Dum Junction | Circular Line | Sovabazar Ahiritola towards Dum Dum Junction |
Route map
Location

Bagbazar railway station is a Kolkata Suburban Railway station in the neighbourhood of Bagbazar. It serves the local areas of Bagbazar in Kolkata, West Bengal, India. The station has two platforms. Its station code is BBR.

== The station ==
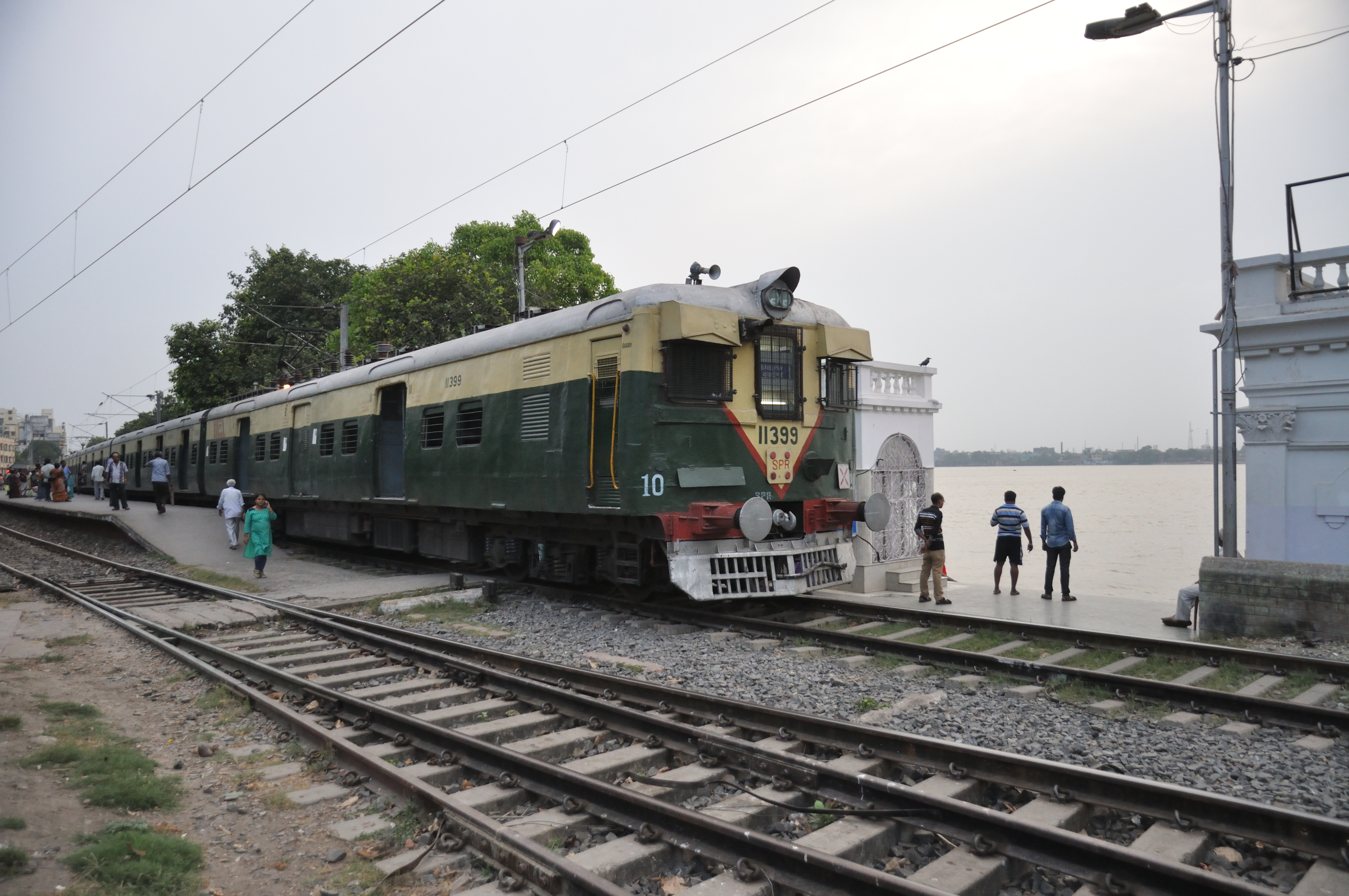
A local train crossing Mayer Ghat at Baghbazar railway station

=== Complex ===
The platform is not very well sheltered. The station lacks many facilities including water and sanitation. There is no proper approach road to this station. The railway station is situated adjacent to Mayer Ghat.

== Connections ==
=== Bus ===
Bus route number 43 serves the station.

=== Ferry ===
Bagbazar Launch Ghat is located nearby.
