= Majerhat railway station =

Railway Station in West Bengal, India

Majerhat
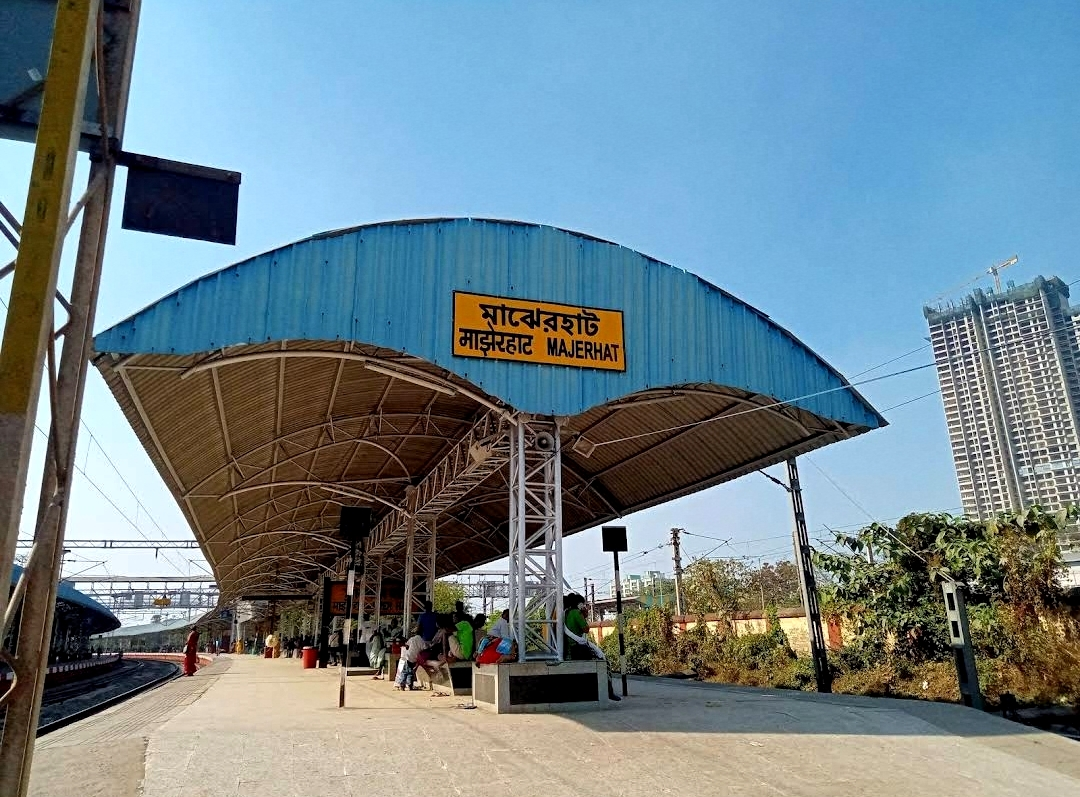
- Majerhat Railway Station

General information
- Location: Majerhat, Kolkata, West Bengal 700053; India
- Coordinates: 22.5190536°N 88.3221307°E
- Elevation: 9 metres (30 ft)
- System: Kolkata Suburban Railway Station
- Owner: Indian Railways
- Operator: Eastern Railway
- Lines: Budge Budge Branch line Kolkata Circular line
- Platforms: 5
- Tracks: 7
- Connections: Majerhat

Construction
- Structure type: Standard (on-ground station)
- Parking: Available
- Cycle facilities: Available
- Accessible: Available

Other information
- Status: Functioning
- Station code: MJT
- Zone(s): Eastern Railway
- Division(s): Sealdah

History
- Opened: 1890; 136 years ago
- Electrified: 1965–1966; 60 years ago
- Former names: Eastern Bengal Railway
Services
Preceding station	Kolkata Suburban Railway	Following station
Brace Bridge towards Budge Budge	Sealdah South Budge Budge Branch line	New Alipore towards Sealdah
Remount Road towards Dum Dum Junction	Circular Line	New Alipore towards Dum Dum Junction
Route map
Location

Majerhat railway station is a Kolkata Suburban Railway Station on the Budge Budge Branch line with an approximate 12 kilometres (7.5 mi) distance from the Sealdah railway station. It is under the jurisdiction of the Eastern Railway zone of Indian Railways. Majerhat railway station is one of the busiest railway stations in the Sealdah railway division. More than 45 pairs of EMU local trains pass through the railway station on a daily basis. It is situated in Kolkata in the Indian state of West Bengal. Majerhat railway station serves Majerhat and Behala areas in Calcutta.

== Geography ==
Majerhat railway station is located at 22°31′09″N 88°19′20″E. It has an average elevation of 9 metres (30 ft).

== History ==
In 1890, the Eastern Bengal Railway constructed a 1,676 mm (5 ft 6 in)-wide broad-gauge railway from Ballygunge Junction to Budge Budge via Majerhat.

== Electrification ==
Electrification from Ballygunge Junction to Budge Budge including Majerhat was completed with 25 kV AC overhead system in 1965–66.

== Station complex ==
EMU arriving at Majerhat railway station

The platform is very much well sheltered. The station possesses many facilities including water and sanitation. There is a proper approach road to this station.
