= Khiddirpur railway station =

Railway station in West Bengal, India

Khiddirpur

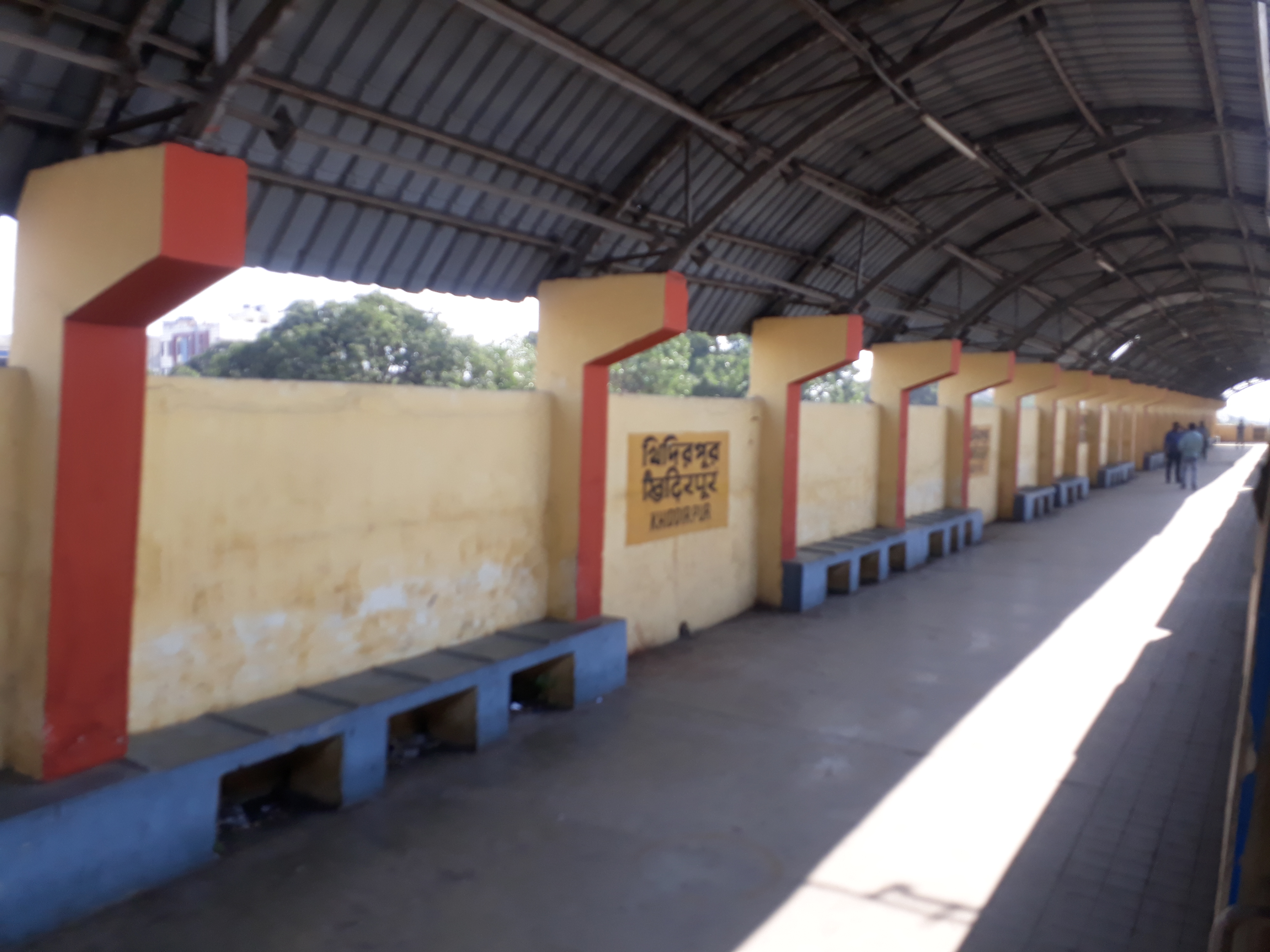
- Khiddirpur railway station

General information
- Location: Kidderpore, Kolkata, West Bengal; India
- Coordinates: 22.537610°N 88.315794°E
- Elevation: 10 metres (33 ft)
- System: Kolkata Suburban Railway station
- Owner: Indian Railways
- Operator: Eastern Railway
- Platforms: 1
- Tracks: 1

Construction
- Structure type: Elevated
- Parking: Available
- Cycle facilities: Not available
- Accessible: Yes

Other information
- Status: Functioning
- Station code: KIRP
- Zone(s): Eastern Railway
- Division(s): Sealdah

History
- Opened: 1995; 31 years ago
- Electrified: 1995; 31 years ago
Services
| Preceding station | Kolkata Suburban Railway | Following station |
|---|---|---|
| Prinsep Ghat towards Dum Dum Junction | Circular Line | Remount Road towards Dum Dum Junction |
Route map
Location

Khiddirpur railway station is a Kolkata Suburban Railway station located in Kidderpore, Kolkata, West Bengal, India. It serves local areas of Kidderpore, Watgunge, Ekbalpur and the Calcutta Dockyard areas in Kolkata district. Only a few local trains halt here. The station has only a single platform. Its station code is KIRP.

== Station complex ==
The platform is very much well sheltered. The station possesses many facilities including water and sanitation. It is well connected to the Dock Eastern Boundary Road in Kidderpore. There is a proper approach road to this station.

=== Station layout ===
| G | Street level | Exit/Entrance & ticket counter |
| P1 | Side platform, No-1 doors will open on the left/right |
| P1 | Track 1 | Prisep Ghat ← toward → Remount Road |

== See also ==
- North 24 Parganas district
- Indian Railways
- Sealdah railway station
- Kolkata Suburban Railway
- Dum Dum Cantonment railway station
- Transport in West Bengal
- List of railway stations in India
