= Park Circus railway station =

Railway station in Kolkata, India

Park Circus
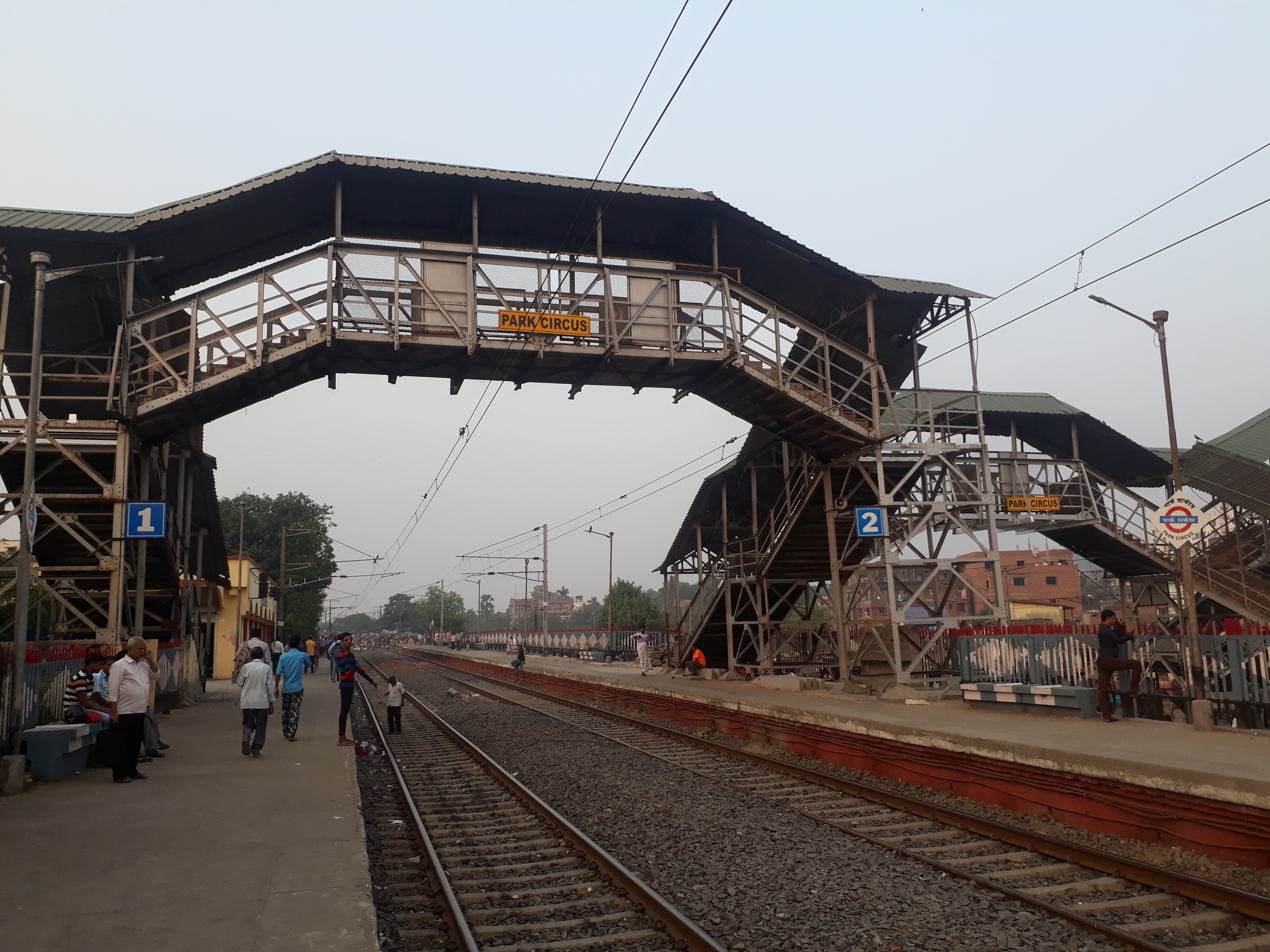
- Park Circus railway station

General information
- Location: Park Circus, Kolkata, West Bengal 700017; India
- Coordinates: 22.5405657°N 88.3738598°E
- Elevation: 9 metres (30 ft)
- System: Kolkata Suburban Railway Station
- Owner: Indian Railways
- Operator: Eastern Railway
- Lines: Main line Kolkata Circular line
- Platforms: 4
- Tracks: 4

Construction
- Structure type: Standard (on-ground station)
- Parking: Not available
- Cycle facilities: Not available
- Accessible: Not available

Other information
- Status: Functioning
- Station code: PQS
- Zone(s): Eastern Railway
- Division(s): Sealdah

History
- Opened: 1862; 164 years ago
- Electrified: 1965–1966; 60 years ago
- Former names: Eastern Bengal Railway
Services
Preceding station	Kolkata Suburban Railway	Following station
Ballygunge Junction towards Sonarpur Junction	Sealdah South Main line	Sealdah Terminus
Ballygunge Junction towards Dum Dum Junction	Circular Line	Sir Gurudas Banerjee Halt towards Dum Dum Junction
Route map
Location

Park Circus railway station is a Kolkata Suburban Railway station on the main line. It is under the jurisdiction of the Sealdah railway division in the Eastern Railway zone of the Indian Railways. It serves the local area of Park Circus in Kolkata in the Indian state of West Bengal.

== History ==
In 1862, the Eastern Bengal Railway constructed a 1,676 mm (5 ft 6 in)-wide broad-gauge railway from Sealdah to Sonarpur Junction via Park Circus.

== Electrification ==
Electrification from Sealdah to Sonarpur Junction including Park Circus was completed with 25 kV AC overhead system in 1965–66.

== Station Complex ==
The platforms are well sheltered and the station complex possess many facilities, including water, sanitation, and overbridges to access the other lines known as the Kankurgachi Chord line of the Kolkata Circular Railway, which is connecting Bidhannagar Road railway station directly with Park Circus railway station, bypassing Sealdah. The station is also well connected to the SH-1, with a proper approach road.
