= Kolkata Circular Railway =

Railway line in Kolkata

Kolkata Circular Railway

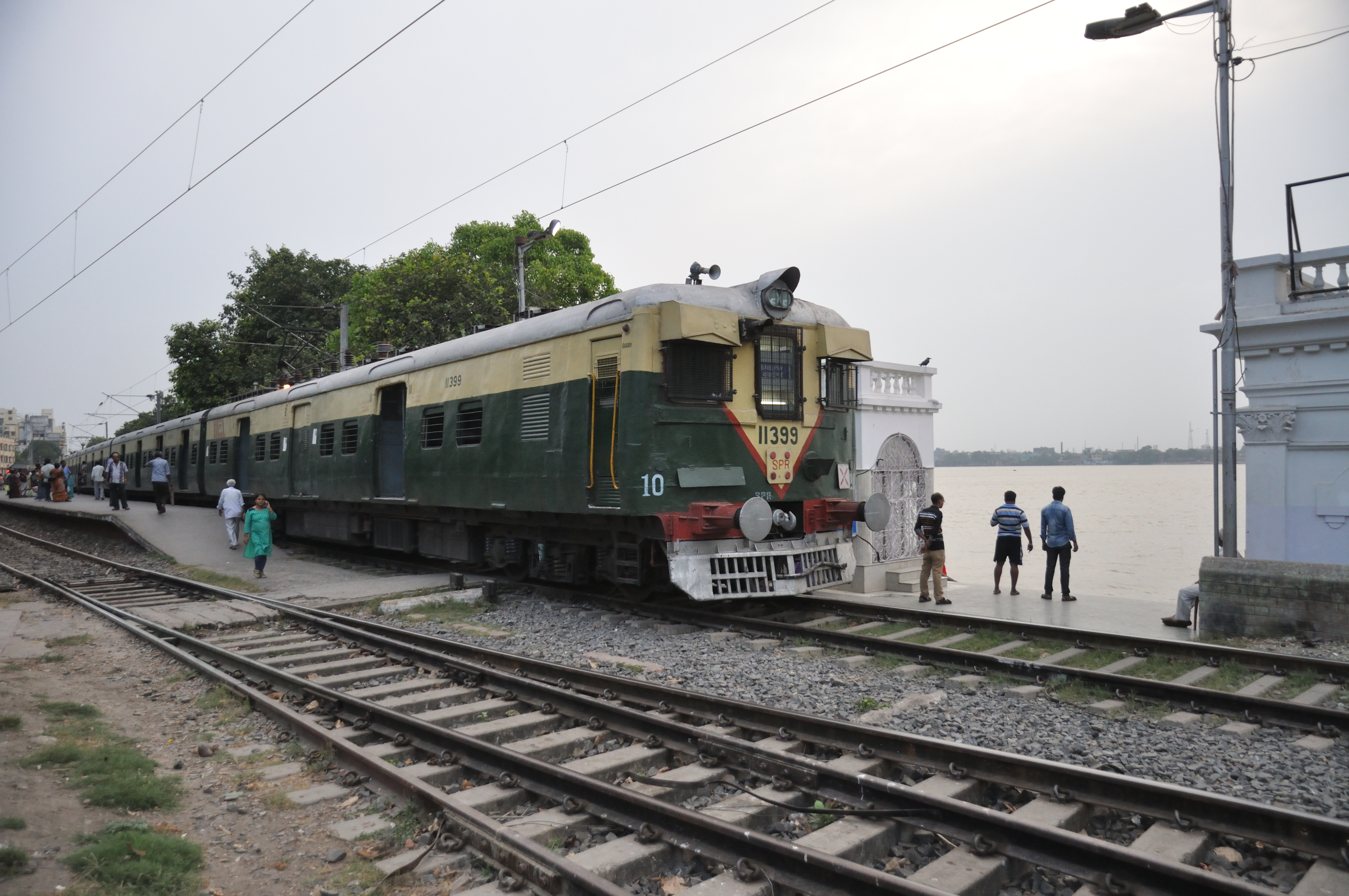
- A local train at Bagbazar railway station

Overview
- Owner: Indian Railway
- Locale: Kolkata
- Termini: Dum Dum Junction; Majerhat
- Stations: Total stations: 19; Interchange stations: 8
- Website: Eastern Railway

Service
- Type: Commuter rail
- System: Kolkata Suburban Railway
- Services: Dum Dum-Majerhat and Majerhat-Bidhannagar Road
- Operator: Eastern Railway
- Depot(s): Kolkata; Majerhat
- Rolling stock: EMUs

History
- Opened: 11 January 1875; 151 years ago

Technical
- Line length: 36.2 km (22 mi)
- Number of tracks: 2
- Character: At grade and elevated
- Track gauge: 5 ft 6 in (1,676 mm) broad gauge
- Electrification: 25 kV overhead line
- Operating speed: up to 65 km per hour

Kolkata Circular Railway, also known as the Kolkata Chakra Rail (Bengali: কলকাতা চক্র রেল), is a 36.20 km (22.49 mi) long railway loop line operated by the Sealdah division of the Eastern Railway zone of Indian Railways, encircling the city of Kolkata.

== Services ==
The line begins and terminates at Dum Dum Junction, with a total of 19 stations spread over the route's 36.20 km (22.49 mi) length (Dumdum junction to Majerhat via Princepghat route :- 18 km (11 mi) & Majerhat to Dumdum junction via Ballygunge Junction route :- 18.2 km (11.3 mi)). Services on the line are operated as an extension of the Kolkata Suburban Railway, partially sharing tracks with the Sealdah South section.

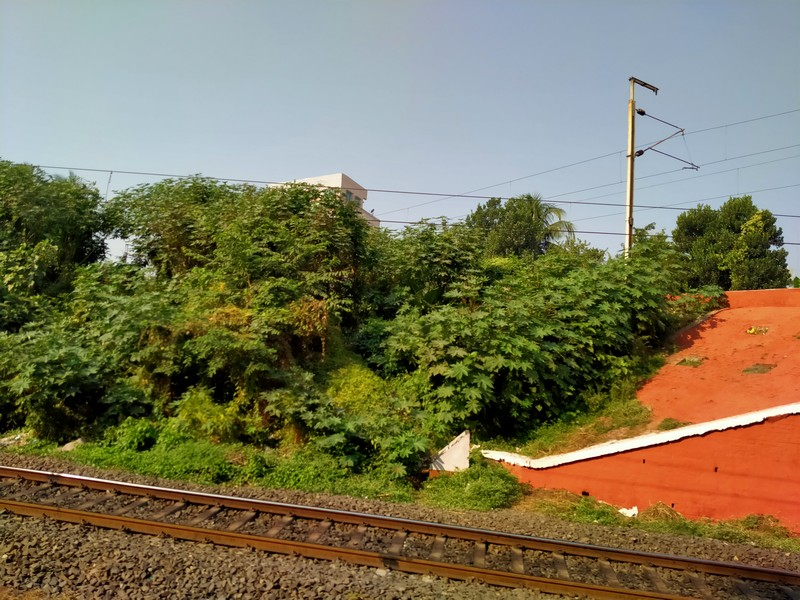
Circular rail line coming from Bidhannagar Road is crossing Sealdah south line near Parkcircus.

The tracks mostly run along the Hooghly river and through Kolkata's central business district, carrying around 36,000 passengers daily. There are also direct services which connect this line to the Sealdah South section skipping Sealdah via the Kankurgachi Chord line. The line is mostly served by 9-car EMU rakes from the Narkeldanga EMU carshed and 12-car EMU rakes from the Sonarpur EMU carshed.

The Circular Railway offers direct interchange points with the Blue Line of the Kolkata Metro at Dum Dum Junction and Tollygunge railway stations while serving a number of prominent city landmarks including Prinsep Ghat and Eden Gardens. The line acts as a major connecting link between the Sealdah South and the Sealdah North sections of the Kolkata Suburban Railway.

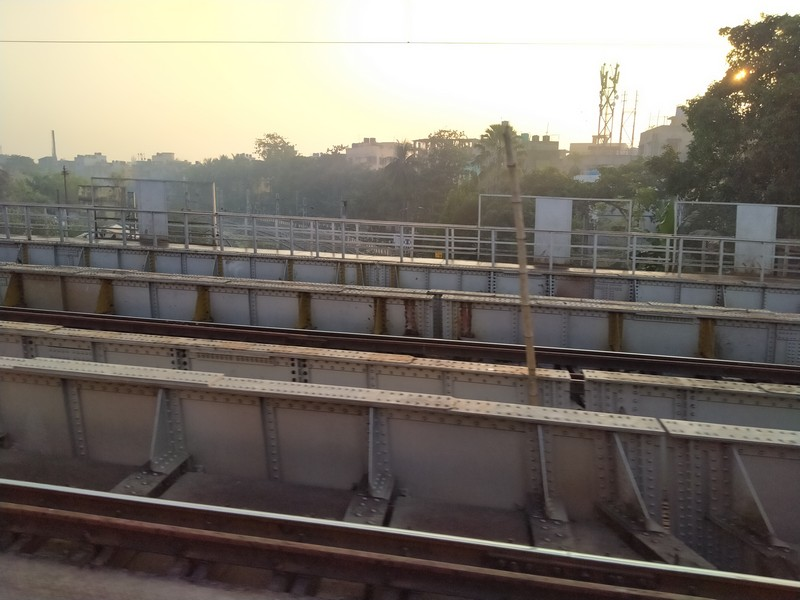
Circular rail line coming from Kolkata rail station is passing under Sealdah north line near Bidhannagar Road.

Kolkata railway station, one of the major railway stations of Kolkata, lies on this line and acts as a major terminus for many national and international long-distance trains like the Akal Takht Express, Hazarduari Express, Maitree Express and Bandhan Express to name a few.

== History ==
=== Calcutta Port Commissioners' Railway ===
The Calcutta Port Commissioners' Railway (reporting mark :CPCR) was a broad gauge (BG) port railway that opened in stages from 1875 onwards serving the docks area of Calcutta along the bank of the Hooghly from Chitpur in the north to Kidderpore Docks in the south.

The first CPCR line opened from Baghbazar, the then terminus of the Calcutta Municipal Railway to Meerbohur Ghat (present day Meer Bahar Ghat) in 1875. The Baghbazar terminus was connected northwards to the Cossipore Gun & Shell Factory near Chitpur on 1878.

The line was extended southwards up to Kidderpore Docks and was opened to goods traffic by 1891. By 1893 the line was constructed up to Chetla. A branch line was also built in 1893 from Kidderpore Docks to Majerhat

In 1936, the CPCR owned 55 locomotives and 1789 goods wagons. The last steam locomotives were retired in 1976.

=== Eastern Bengal Railway ===
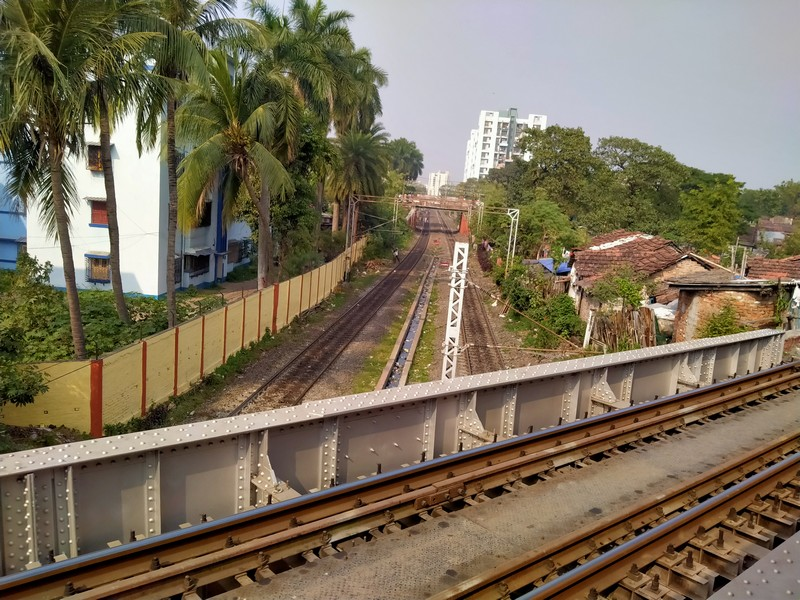
Circular rail line is crossing Sdah south line near Parkcircus

In the northern half, the Chitpur Terminus extension was built in 1903 and connected with Dum Dum by the Eastern Bengal Railway (reporting mark :EBR).

A loop line meant for goods traffic was built from Dum Dum junction to Dum Dum Cantonment via Patipukur on 1904.

In the southern section the Budge Budge branch line was built from Ballygunge to Budge Budge. This line formed a connection to the CPCR lines at Majerhat and Brace Bridge junctions.

In 1907 the Kankurgachi Chord line was built bypassing Sealdah and linking the northern and southern sections of the Eastern Bengal Railway.

=== Post-Independence ===
With the silting of Hooghly river and inaccessibility of bigger ships most of the CPCR lines fell into disuse while the growing population and traffic problems of Kolkata made planners to think of new commuting solutions. The Ginwala Committee of 1947 and the Garbutt Report of 1966 recommended forming a Circular railway with elevated tracks for lower expenses and easier construction for a north–south corridor.

A high level Metropolitan Transport Team set up by the Planning Commission in 1965 to study the metropolitan transport requirements of Bombay, Calcutta, Delhi and Madras recommended in case of Calcutta, the construction of a part of circular railway known as suburban Dispersal Line (Dum-Dum to Princep Ghat) to facilitate the dispersal of the commuters arriving at the railway terminus at Sealdah and Howrah and a provision of Mass Rapid Transit System (MRTS) for catering to the intra-city traffic .

As a result, the Baghbazar-Prinsep Ghat line was rehabilitated and commissioned for passenger traffic on 15 August 1984. Services were subsequently extended northwards towards Tala and finally to Dum Dum by 17 June 1990.

The Prinsep Ghat-Majerhat elevated section was commissioned in 2005 thus completing the Circular railway line.

The Dum Dum Cantonment–Biman Bandar branch line was built by the Eastern Railway zone of the Indian Railways and was inaugurated in July 2006. Due to losses and poor patronage owing to the location of the station and odd timings of the services, the services on the line were closed down in 2016. The line was further dismantled in 2020 to make way for the Yellow Line.

== Stations ==
Names in bold indicate that the station is a major stop or an important interchange/terminal station.

#	Station Name			Connections	Picture	Notes
#	English	Bengali	Code	Connections	Picture	Notes
1	**Dum Dum Junction**	দমদম জংশন	DDJ	Sealdah Main and North section		Biggest railway junction in Kolkata
1	**Dum Dum Junction**	দমদম জংশন	DDJ	Dum Dum		Biggest railway junction in Kolkata
2	Patipukur	পাতিপুকুর	PTKR	–		
3	**Kolkata**	কলকাতা	KOAA	–		Major railway station of Eastern Railway
4	Tala	টালা	TALA	–		
5	Bagbazar	বাগবাজার	BBR	Bagbazar Launch Ghat, former interchange with tram		
6	Sovabazar Ahiritola	শোভাবাজার আহিরীটোলা	SOLA	Sovabazar Launch Ghat		Tourist spot: Rajbari
6	Sovabazar Ahiritola	শোভাবাজার আহিরীটোলা	SOLA	Ahiritola Ghat		Tourist spot: Rajbari
7	Burrabazar	বড়বাজার	BZB	Jagannath Ghat		
8	**B.B.D Bag**	বি.বা.দী. বাগ	BBDB	Fairlie Place Ghat, former interchange with tram		Tourist spot: Millennium Park, Currency Building, also major office buildings like General Post Office, Police HQ, Reserve Bank, Writers Building
9	Eden Gardens	ইডেন গার্ডেন্স	EDG	Outram Ghat		Tourist spot: Gwalior Monument, also major buildings like Cricket Stadium, High Court, Assembly, Town Hall
10	Prinsep Ghat	প্রিন্সেপ ঘাট	PPGT	Prinsep Ghat		Tourist spots: Princep Ghat, Fort William, Laskar War Memorial
11	Khiddirpur	খিদিরপুর	KIRP	former interchange with tram	Elevated Khidirpur rail station with single line, and dock at the background	
12	Remount Road	রিমাউন্ট রোড	RMTR		–	
13	**Majerhat**	মাঝেরহাট	MJT	Sealdah–Budge Budge branch line		
13	**Majerhat**	মাঝেরহাট	MJT	Majerhat, former interchange with tram		
14	New Alipore	নিউ আলিপুর	NACC	Sealdah–Budge Budge branch line		
15	Tollygunge	টালিগঞ্জ	TLG	Sealdah–Budge Budge branch line		
15	Tollygunge	টালিগঞ্জ	TLG	Rabindra Sarobar, former interchange with tram		
16	Lake Gardens	লেক গার্ডেন্স	LKF	Sealdah–Budge Budge branch line		
17	**Ballygunge**	বালিগঞ্জ	BLN	Sealdah South section, former interchange with tram		Big railway junction
18	Park Circus	পার্ক সার্কাস	PQS	Sealdah South section		
19	Sir Gurudas Banerjee Halt	স্যার গুরুদাস ব্যানার্জি হল্ট	SGBA	–		
20	**Bidhannagar Road**	বিধাননগর রোড	BNXR	Sealdah Main and North section, former interchange with tram		

=== Proposed stations ===
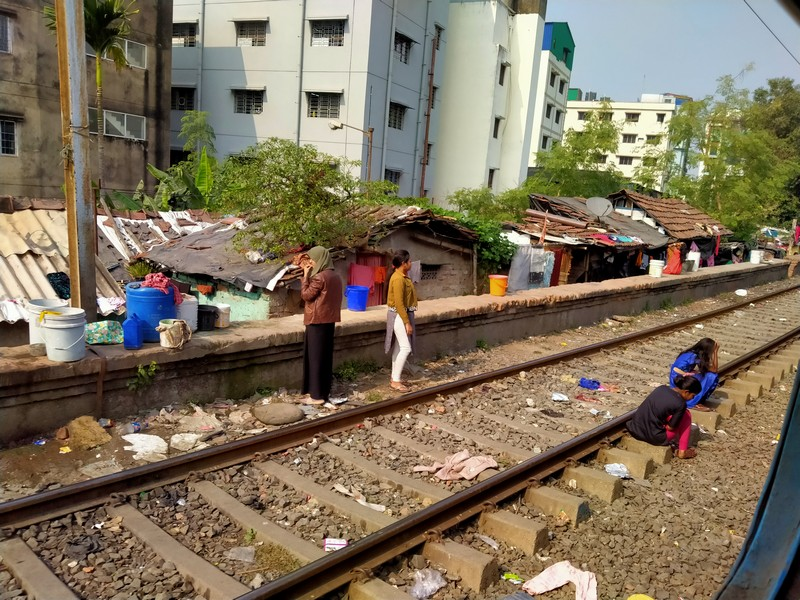
The platform of Kamardanga station, after abandonment during construction

Two new stations were planned in the Kankurgachi Chord line section of the line between Park Circus and Sir Gurudas Banerjee Halt stations, namely Kamardanga Halt (serving Tangra) and Beliaghata Main Road but the plan was ultimately cancelled. Although the construction of the Kamardanga Halt station was started on 27 February 2011, it was not completed and currently lies abandoned.

== Gallery ==
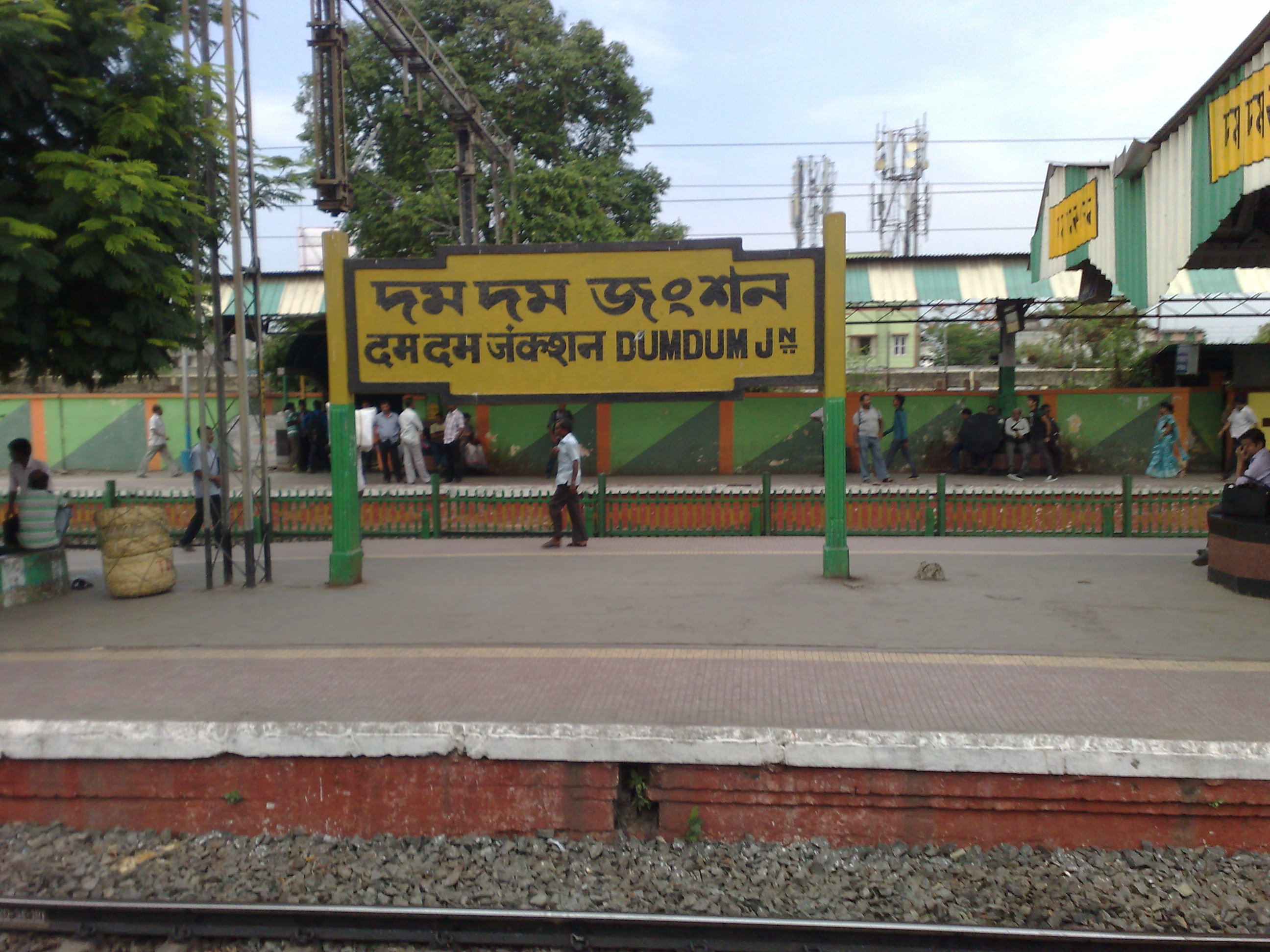
Dum Dum Junction platform board

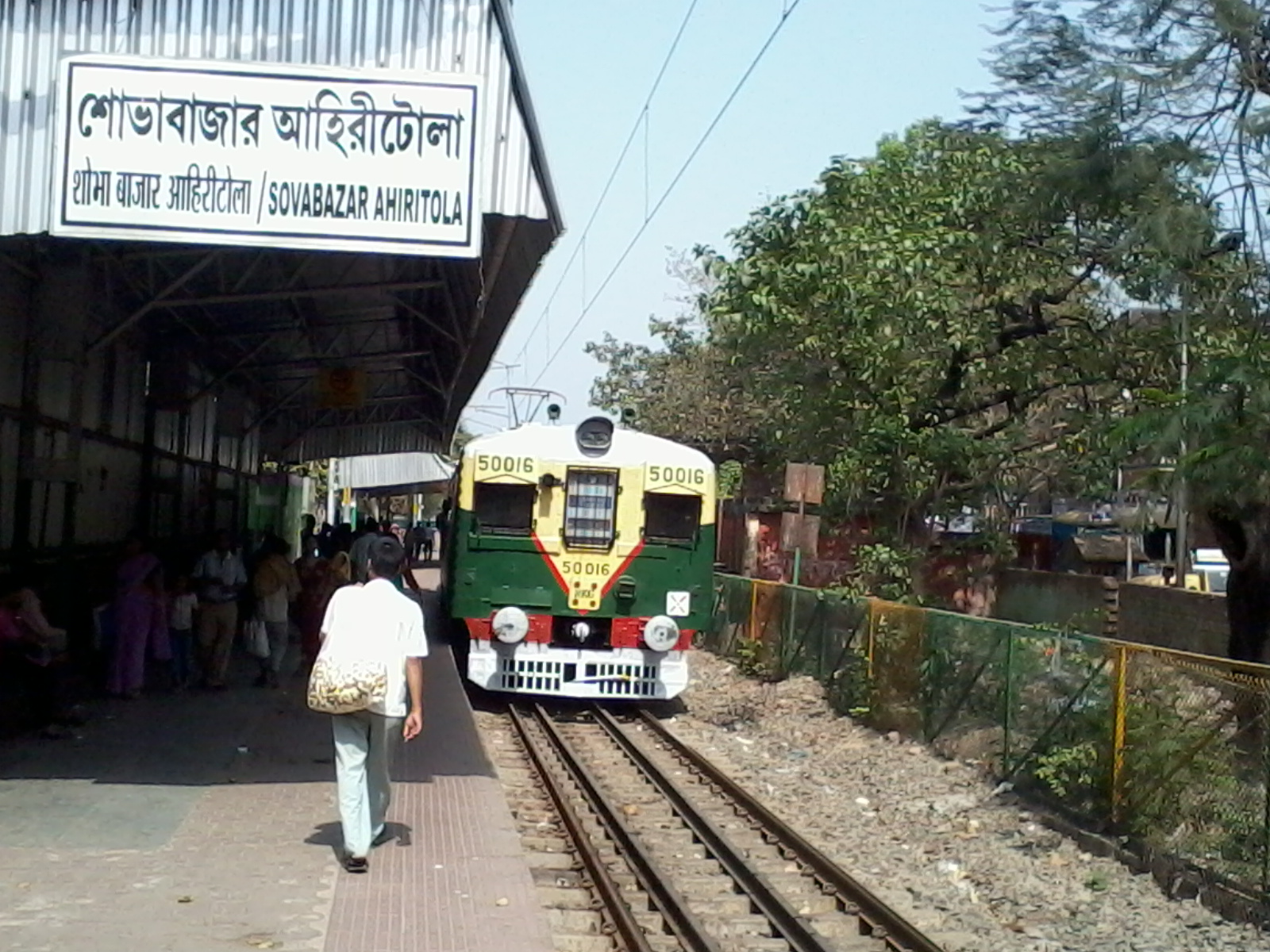
Sovabazar Ahiritola station

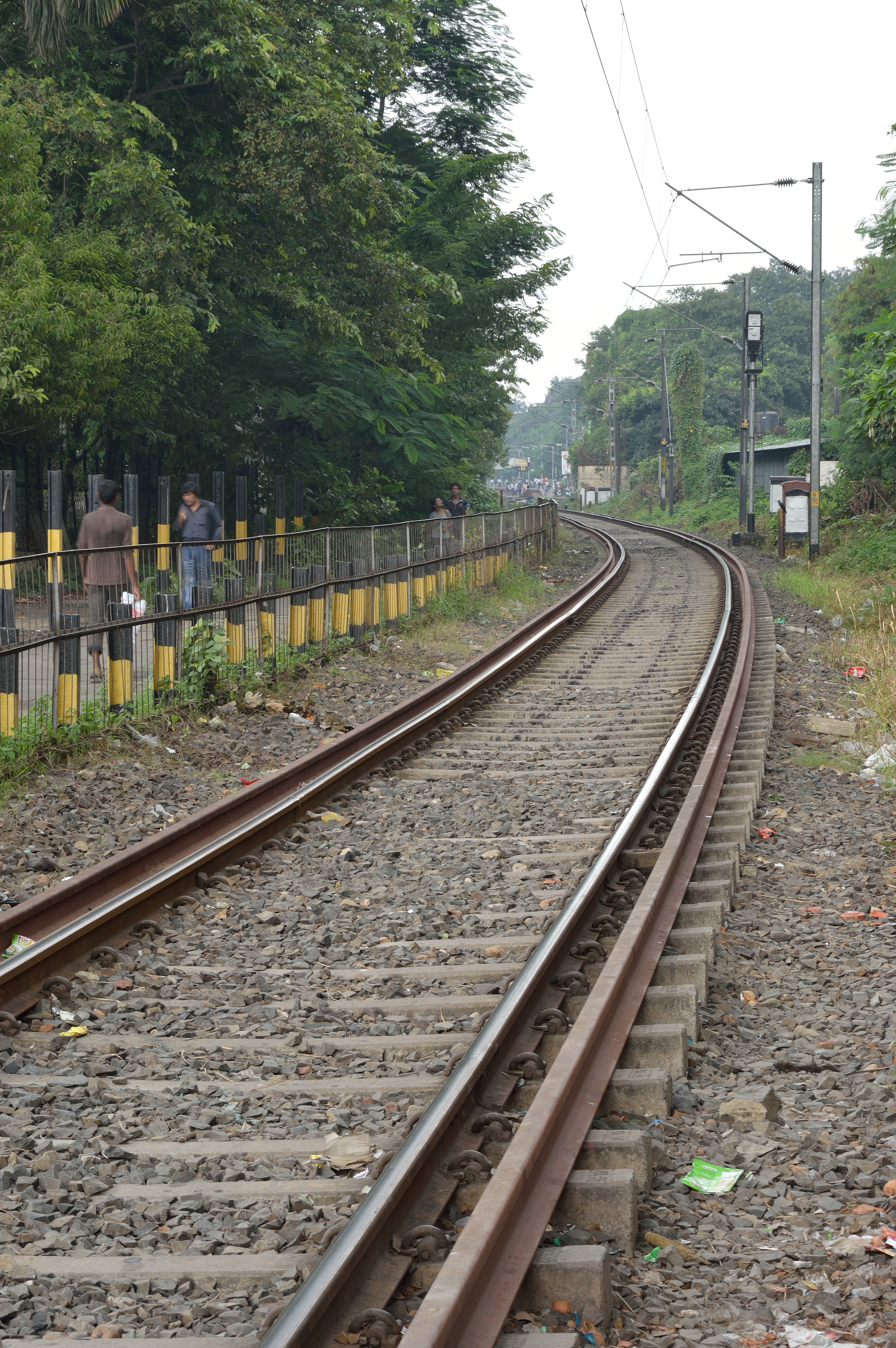
Circular Railway track

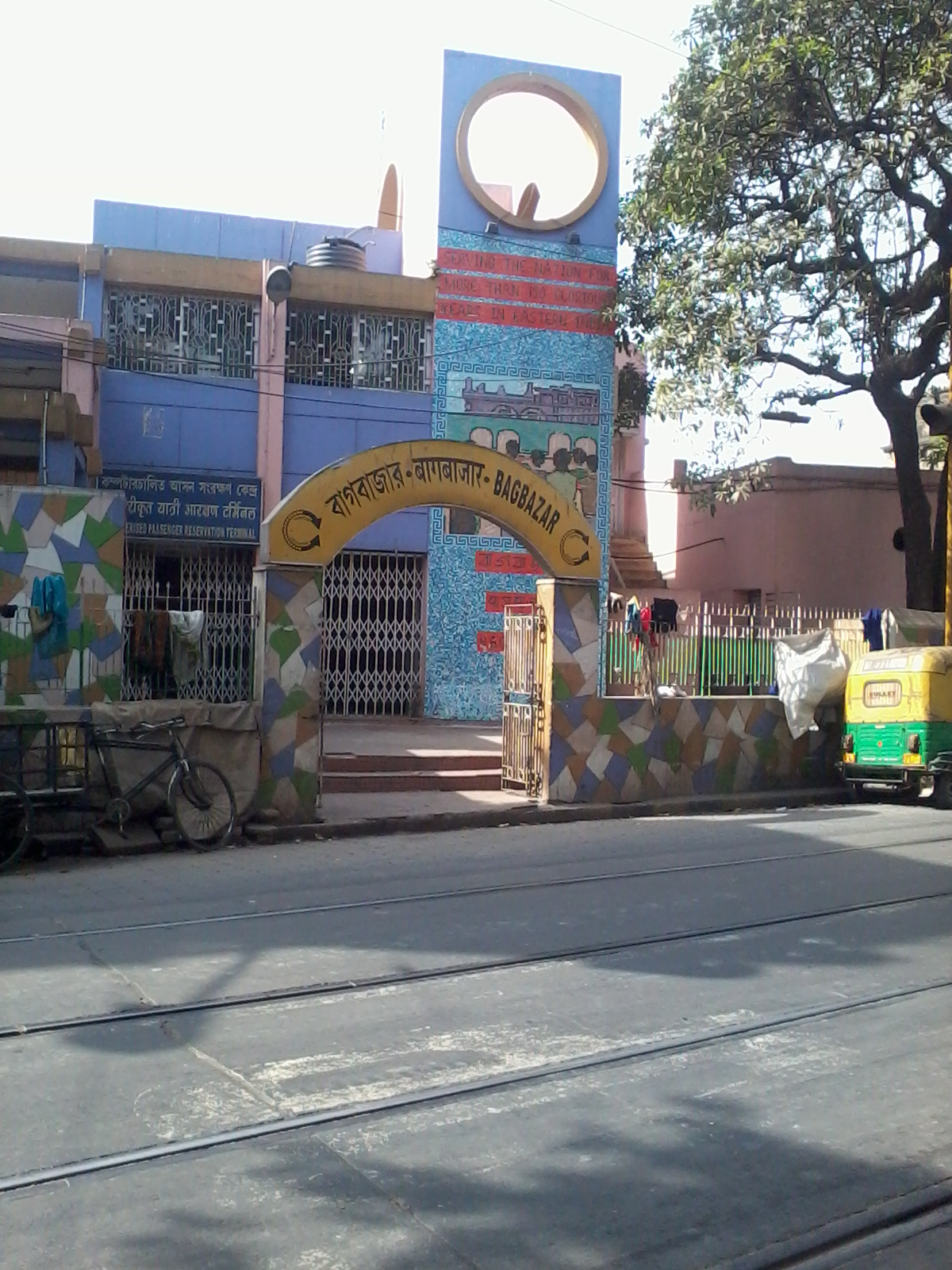
Bagbazar station

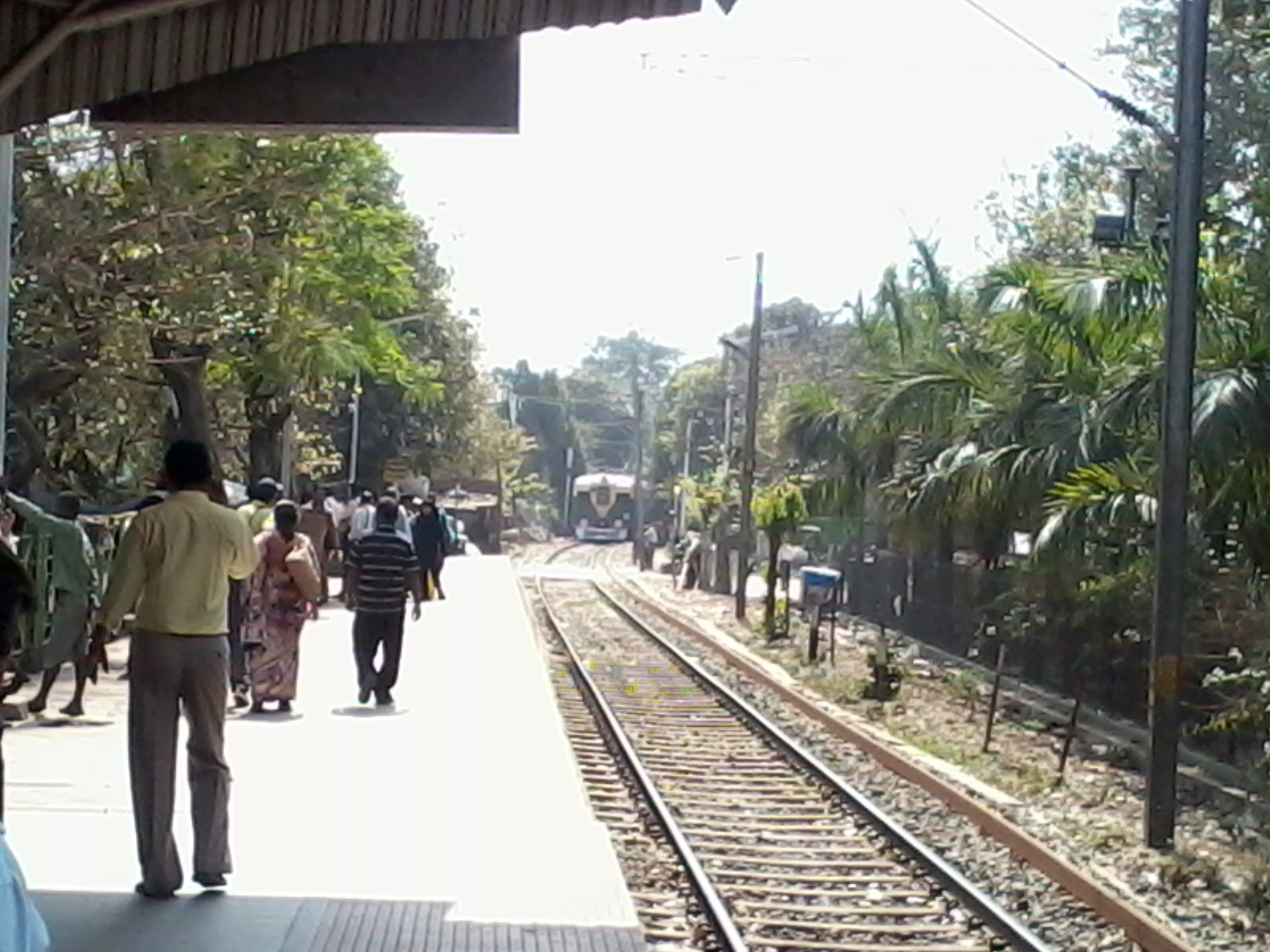
Eden Gardens station

== See also ==
- Transport in Kolkata
- Kolkata Suburban Railway
- Kolkata Metro
- Kolkata Tram
