= Khiddirpur =

Village in Ayodhya district, India

- Village
- Location in Uttar Pradesh, India Khiddirpur (India)
- Coordinates: 26.6°N 82.13°E
- Country: India
- State: Uttar Pradesh
- Division: Ayodhya division
- District: Ayodhya district
- Tehsil: Bikapur

Languages
  - Official language: Hindi
  - Regional language: Awadhi
- Time zone: UTC+5:30 (IST)
- PIN: 224209

Khiddirpur is a village in Gram Panchayat, Bikapur Tehsil, Ayodhya district in the state of Uttar Pradesh, India. Khiddirpur is 43 km south of the district headquarters Ayodhya city, and it had a population of approximately 7,000 in 2011.

== Education ==
There are many schools and colleges in Chaure Bazar, Ayodhya including:

- Government Primary School, Bharahu Khatta, Chaure Bazar, Ayodhya.
- Triloki Nath Inter College, Chaure Bazar, Ayodhya.
- BGN Inter College, Manchha Sonaura, Chaure Bazar, Ayodhya.
- Kasturba Gandhi School, Chaure Bazar, Ayodhya.

== Demographics ==
As of the 2011 Census of India, Khiddirpur had a population of approximately 7,000, with males constituting 51% of the population and females 49%. Khiddirpur has an average literacy rate of 53.58%, compared to the national average of 76.32%; 58.14% of males and 49.99% of females are literate. 18% of the population is under 6 years of age.

== Transport ==
=== Rail ===
The nearest train station is Chaure Bazar Station, which is less than 5 km away.

=== Air ===
Ayodhya International Airport is the nearest airport to Khiddirpur.

=== Road ===
Khiddirpur is situated less than 2 km west of National Highway-330 which runs north-south. Khiddirpur is thus well connected with nearby cities such as Ayodhya and Sultanpur, as well as other small towns in the area.
