= Lascar War Memorial =

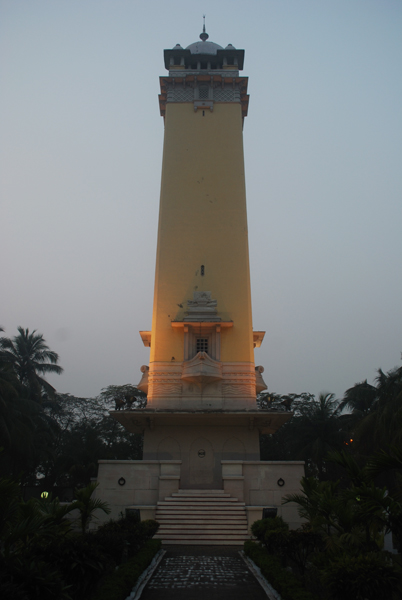
- Lascar War Memorial, Kolkata
- Interactive map of the Lascar War Memorial area

General information
- Type: Monument
- Architectural style: Indo – Mughal Style
- Location: Hastings, Kolkata, Napier Road, Kolkata, West Bengal, India
- Coordinates: 22.55°N 88.33°E
- Construction started: 1920
- Completed: 6 February 1924
- Renovated: 2011–present
- Owner: Indian Navy

Height
- Height: 100 feet (30 m) (approximately)

Design and construction
- Architect: William Ingram Keir

The Lascar War Memorial, located on Napier Road in the Hastings area of Kolkata, is a memorial dedicated to the memory of the 896 lascars (sailors from the Indian subcontinent) who died serving on ships of the Royal Navy and British Merchant Service during World War I.

== Lascar ==
He had thought that the Lascars were a tribe or nation, like the Cherokee or Sioux: he discovered now that they came from places that were far apart, and had nothing in common, except the Indian Ocean; among them were Chinese and East Africans, Arabs and Malays, Bengalis and Goans, Tamils and Arakanese.

— Sea of Poppies by Amitav Ghosh

A lascar (Lashkar, Laskar) (Persian: لشکر) and (Bengali:লস্কর) was a sailor or militiaman from the Indian subcontinent or other countries east of the Cape of Good Hope, employed on European ships from the 16th century until the beginning of the 20th century. The word comes from the Persian Lashkar, meaning military camp or army, and al-askar, the Arabic word for a guard or soldier. The Portuguese adapted this term to lascarim, meaning an Asian militiaman or seaman, especially those from the Indian Subcontinent. Lascars served on British ships under 'lascar' agreements which gave shipowners more control than the usual agreement. The sailors could be transferred from one ship to another and retained in service for up to three years at one time. The name lascar was also used to refer to Indian servants, typically engaged by British military officers.

== History and architecture ==
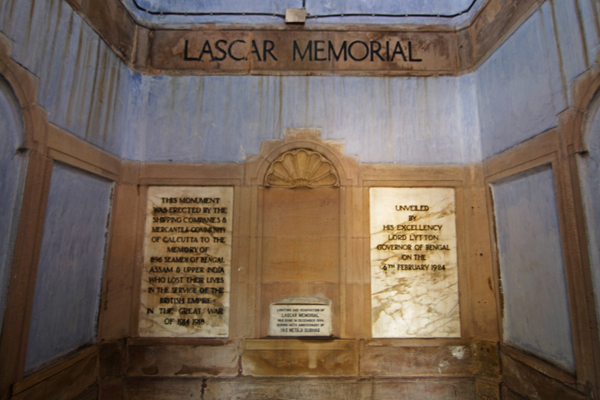
Inside the Lascar War Memorial

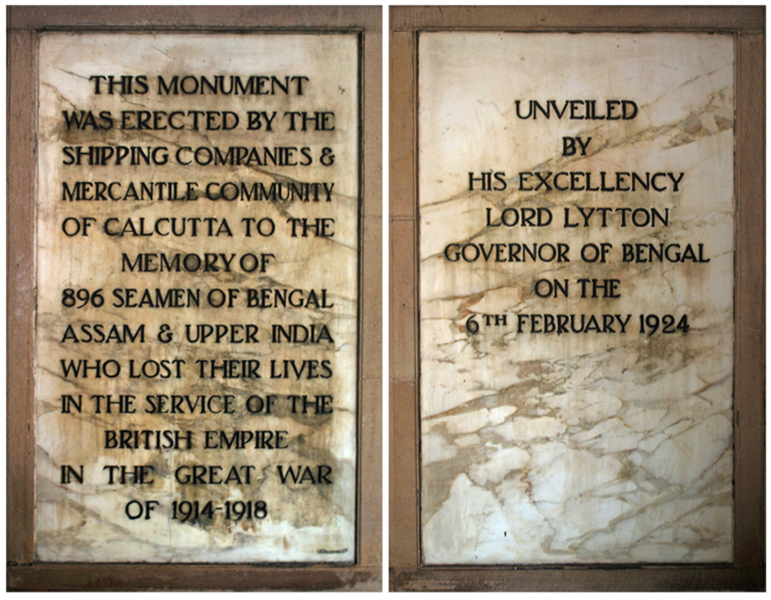
Inside the Lascar War Memorial

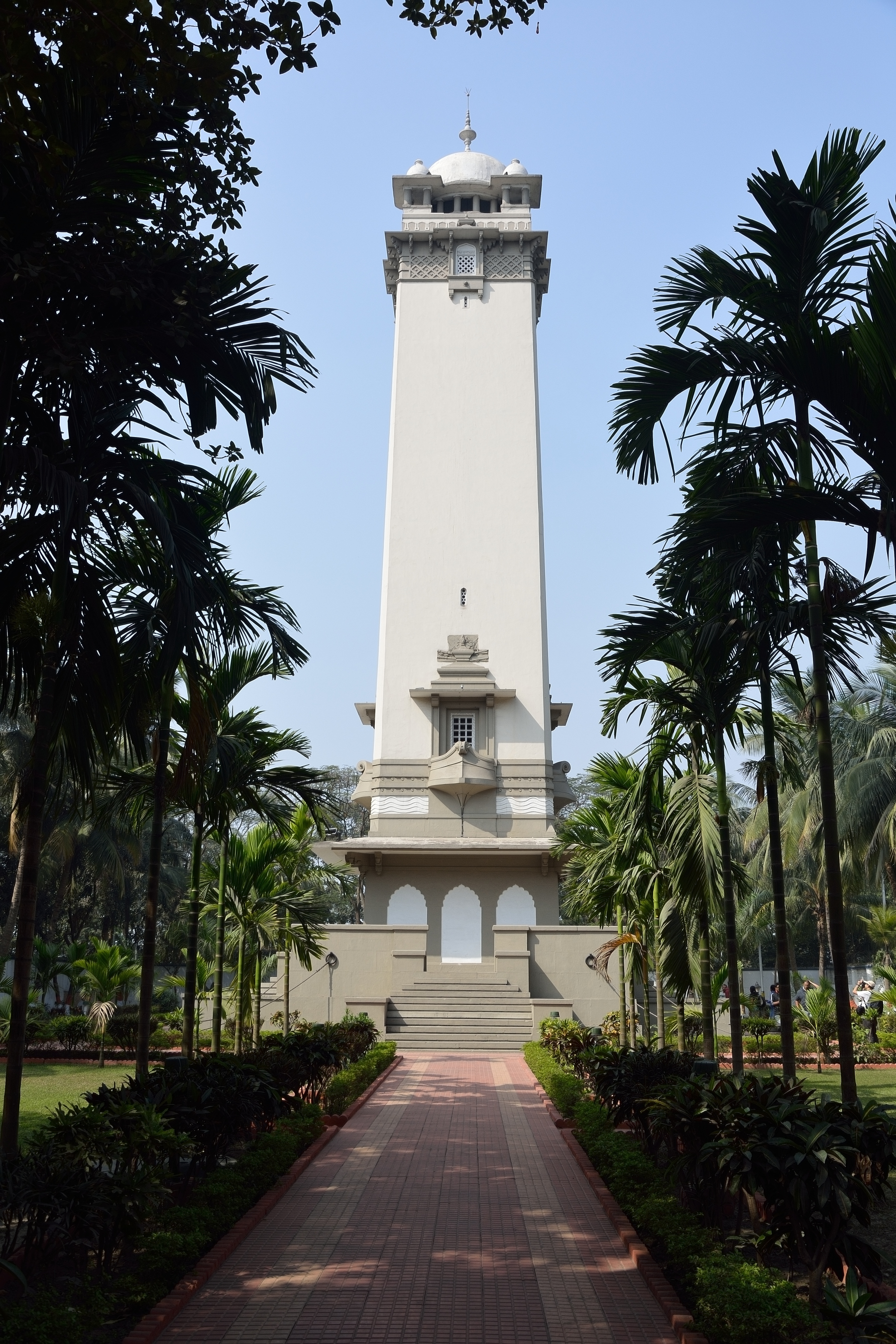
Lascar War Memorial

The Lascar War Memorial was erected by shipping and mercantile companies, in the memory of the 896 Lascars of undivided Bengal and Assam who lost their lives during World War I. The monument is situated at the southern end of the Maidan, on Naiper Road, Hastings, near Prinsep Ghat. The 100 feet high monument was unveiled by Lord Lytton, then Governor of Bengal on 6 February 1924. The monument, built in typical Oriental style, is a four-sided column, having designs reflecting the prow of an ancient galley on each side of the column. The upper part of the monument consists of four small minarets and a large gilt dome. A typical Indian look has been given by adding wavy lines beneath the projected balcony, which symbolises waves, along with chhajjas and trellises. The Lascar War Memorial has similarities with the victory tower of Chittor. The memorial built in the Indo-Mughal style by William Ingram Keir, who also designed the Kidderpore Bridge, buildings at Bengal Engineering and Science University in Shibpur, the Indian Institute of Technology, Kharagpur, and Islamia College, and also replaced the 1934 earthquake affected spire of St. Paul's Cathedral, Kolkata with a tower. William Ingram Keir won a prize of Rupees 500 for designing the memorial. The inside of the Memorial is approached through a huge doorway on the Northern wall. The interior contains three plaques below the inscription "Lascar Memorial." One plaque commemorates the unveiling of the memorial by Lytton. The second plaques says that the memorial was erected by shipping and mercantile community of India in memory of the 896 seamen of Bengal Assam and upper India (the term Lascar is not used) who lost their lives in service of the British Empire in the great war of 1914 – 18. The third smaller plaques tells about the renovation and lighting of the Lascar War Memorial.

== Renovation ==
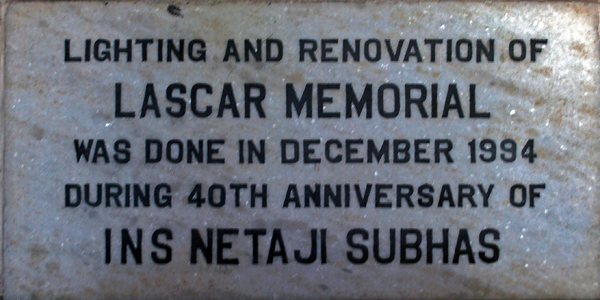
Renovation plaque Lascar War Memorial

In 1994, commodore B K Mohanti spotted the ruined and neglected Lascar War Memorial overgrown with vegetation during his morning walk. Recognising the importance of the monument, Mohanty arranged for funds for the renovation of the memorial. The renovation and lightning was completed in December 1994. A.L. Dias, then Governor of West Bengal, switched on the illumination on 7 December 1994 on the occasion of the 40th anniversary of INS Netaji Subhas.

== Events ==
Lascar War memorial is the venue for several events:

=== National Navy Day India ===
National Navy Day of India is celebrated every year at the Lascar War Memorial every year on 4 December. On 4 December 2012, James Keir, son of William Ingram Keir, the architect of the Lascar War Memorial visited the memorial. Commodore B K Mohanti, who took the initiative to restore the memorial, was also present. The event was an initiative by Indian National Trust for Art and Cultural Heritage (INTACH), Kolkata Chapter, to popularise lesser known monuments in Kolkata.

=== Apeejay Kolkata Literary Festival ===
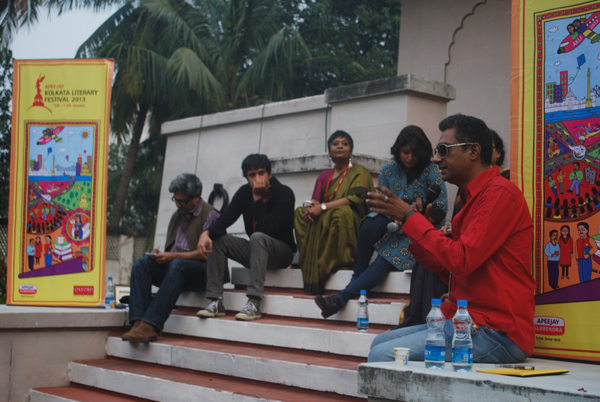
Apeejay Kolkata Literary Fest

On 13 Jan. 2013 the Lascar War Memorial was the venue of the Apeejay Kolkata Literary Festival. Apeejay Kolkata Literary Festival 2013 on its closing day hosted an afternoon literary session at the compound of the Lascar War Memorial. The event consisted of several book reading sections, a debate on the topic "Is Kolkata still the cultural capital of India" and a music band session. Apeejay Kolkata Literary Festival also featured the live performance of traditional baul singers and poto chitra artists.

== Photo gallery ==
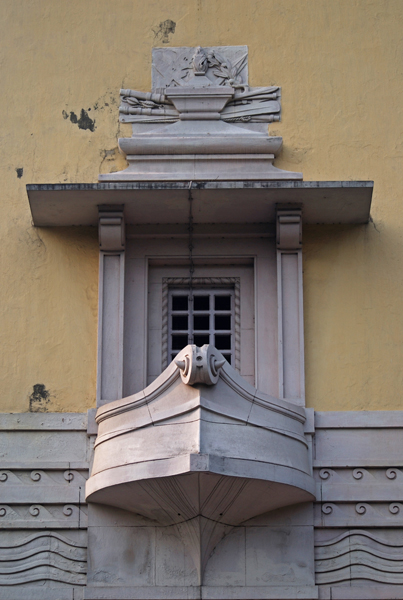
Balcony of the Lascar War Memorial

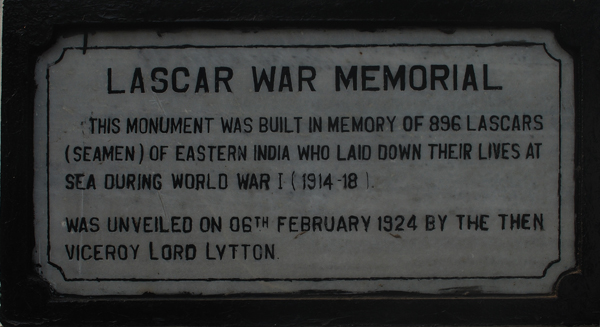
Plaque at the entrance of the Lascar War Memorial compound

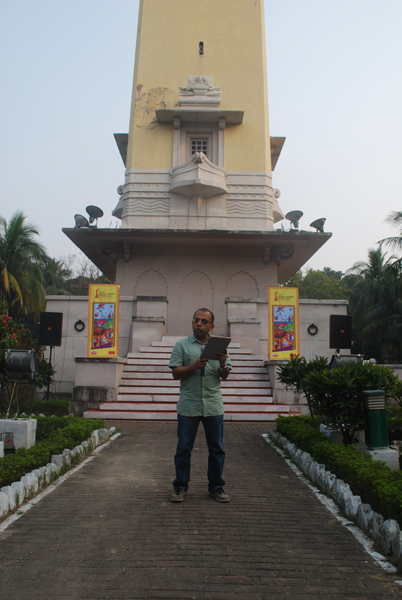
Book reading session, Apeejay Kolkata Literary Festival
