= Ballygunge Junction railway station =

Railway Station in West Bengal, India

Ballygunge Junction
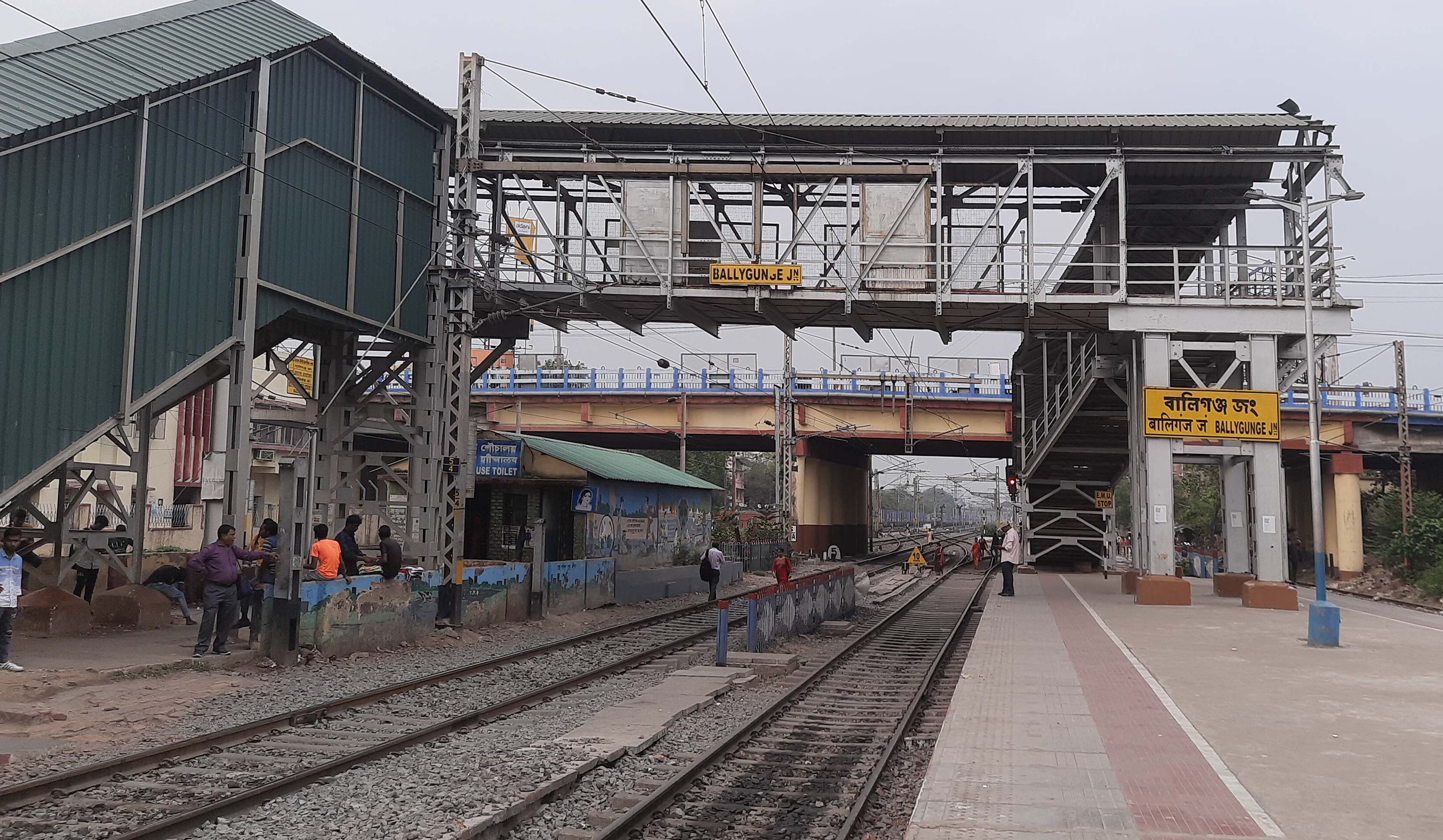
- Ballygunge Junction Railway Station

General information
- Location: Ballygunge, Ekdalia, Kolkata, West Bengal 700019; India
- Coordinates: 22.5191616°N 88.3721923°E
- Elevation: 9 metres (30 ft)
- System: Kolkata Suburban Railway
- Owner: Indian Railways
- Operator: Eastern Railway
- Lines: Main line Budge Budge Branch line Kolkata Circular line
- Platforms: 4
- Tracks: 6
- Connections: Bus stand

Construction
- Structure type: Standard (on-ground station)
- Parking: Available
- Cycle facilities: Available
- Accessible: Available

Other information
- Status: Functioning
- Station code: BLN
- Zone(s): Eastern Railway
- Division(s): Sealdah

History
- Opened: 1862; 164 years ago
- Electrified: 1965–1966; 60 years ago
- Former names: Eastern Bengal Railway
Services
Preceding station	Kolkata Suburban Railway	Following station
Dhakuria towards Sonarpur Junction	Sealdah South Main line & Budge Budge Branch line	Park Circus towards Sealdah
Lake Gardens towards Budge Budge	Sealdah South Main line & Budge Budge Branch line	Park Circus towards Sealdah
Lake Gardens towards Dum Dum Junction	Circular Line	Park Circus towards Dum Dum Junction
Route map
Location

Ballygunge Junction railway station is a Kolkata Suburban Railway junction station on the Main line with an approximate 6 kilometres (3.7 mi) distance from the Sealdah railway station. It is under the jurisdiction of the Eastern Railway zone of Indian Railways. Ballygunge Junction railway station is one of the busiest railway stations in the Sealdah railway division. More than 150 pairs of EMU local trains pass through the railway station on a daily basis. It is situated in Ballygunge, Kolkata in the Indian state of West Bengal. It serves Ballygunge and the surrounding areas.

== Geography ==
Ballygunge Junction railway station is located at 22°31′09″N 88°22′20″E. It has an average elevation of 9 metres (30 ft).

== History ==
In 1862, the Eastern Bengal Railway constructed a 1,676 mm (5 ft 6 in)-wide broad-gauge railway from Sealdah to Sonarpur Junction via Ballygunge Junction.

== Electrification ==
Electrification from Sealdah to Sonarpur Junction including Ballygunge Junction was completed with 25 kV AC overhead system in 1965–66.

== Station complex ==
The platform is well sheltered. The station possesses many facilities including water and sanitation. It is well connected to the SH-1. There is a proper approach road to this station.
