= Narendra Krishna Deb =

Indian politician

Maharaja Bahadur Narendra Krishna Deb নরেন্দ্রকৃষ্ণ দেব KCIE
- Born: 10 October 1822; Calcutta, Bengal Presidency, British India (now Kolkata, India)
- Died: 20 March 1903 (aged 80); Calcutta, Bengal Presidency, British India
- Predecessor: Radhakanta Deb
- Father: Raja Rajkrishna Deb
- Family: Nabakrishna Deb (grandfather); Gopi Mohun Deb (step-uncle); Apurbo Krishna Deb (elder brother)

Sir Maharaja Bahadur Narendra Krishna Deb (Bengali: নরেন্দ্রকৃষ্ণ দেব; 10 October 1822 – 20 March 1903) was a scion of Sovabazar Raj family and a noted citizen of his time.

He was son of Raja Rajkrishna Deb (1782–1823). His father was son of Raja Nabakrishna Deb, who was born after Nabakrishna adopted Gopi Mohun Deb. Narendra Krishna and was educated at the Hindu College. He served as deputy magistrate from 1844 to 1853. Later, he served as Municipal Commissioner of Calcutta, Justice of Peace, Honorary Magistrate. He was a member of Governor-General's Legislative Council and also served as president of British Indian Association and a fellow of Calcutta University.

He was made Raja in 1875, Maharaja in 1878, knighted KCIE in 1888 and Maharaja Bahadur in 1888. He succeeded Sovabazar Zamindari in 1867 upon the death of his predecessor Sir Raja Bahadur Radhakanta Deb.

He died in 1903.
