= Apurbo Krishna Kunvar =

19th-century Bengali Urdu and Persian poet from the Sovabazar royal family

Maharaja Bahadur Apurbo Krishna Kunwar
- اپورب کشن دَیب بہادر کنورؔ
- Born: 1815; Bengal Presidency, British India
- Died: 1867 (aged 51–52); Calcutta, Bengal Presidency, British India
- Occupations: Poet, writer
- Parent: Raja Rajkrishna Deb (father)
- Relatives: Nabakrishna Deb (grandfather); Gopi Mohun Deb (step-uncle); Narendra Krishna Deb (younger brother)
- Writing career
- Language: Urdu, Persian
- Genres: Ghazal, epic, biography
- Notable works: Dīvān; Shahnamah

Apurbo Krishna Deb Bahadur "Kunvar" (Note: Bengali: অপূর্ব কৃষ্ণ দেব বাহাদুর, Urdu: اپورب کشن دَیب بہادر کنورؔ) (1815 – 1867) was a poet and writer in Urdu and Persian from Bengal. He belonged to the royal Sovabazar Raj. His name is mentioned in Tazkira Nuskha-e-Dilkashā by Janamejaya Mitra Arman, and in Tazkira-i-Shu'ara-yi-Urdu by Garcin de Tassy. Apurbo Krishna was the author of a full Dīvān, and his most distinguished literary work was a multi-volume Shahnamah dedicated to the Muslim monarchs of India. According to Harit Krishna Deb (his descendant), around 1848, he presented a four-volume manuscript of this Shahnamah to the American Oriental Society, and became the first Indian to be made an honorary member of the society. This contribution is noted in the Society's 1849 annual report.

== Biography ==
Apurbo Krishna was born in 1815 into the royal family of Sovabazar Raj, located in present-day West Bengal. He received his early education at Dharmatala Academy School in Calcutta. From a young age, he showed a inclination towards poetry and adopted the pen name "Kunvar". He was admired for his melodious voice and was known to sing ghazals accompanied by musical instruments every morning. Kunvar served as a court-poet at the Mughal imperial court in Delhi. In the Masnavi-e-Kunvar, there is a second panegyric that honors Bahadur Shah Zafar, the final Mughal ruler of Delhi. Some of his verses indicate that he was a devotee of Vishnu; notably, the first qasida of his masnavi opens with praise of Krishna.

He had two sons: Kumar Krishna and Upendra Krishna. He died in 1867 at the age of 52.

== Works ==
- A four-volume Persian chronicle titled Shahnama-ye Hind (Note: شاهنامهٔ هند) was presented to Queen Victoria in 1848. A copy of the same was also gifted to the American Oriental Society.
- Two Urdu divāns (collections of poetry). The first was reportedly published in 1843 (Bengali year 1250), and is referenced in the Awadh Catalogue. The second, published in 1844 (Bengali year 1251), is preserved at the Khuda Bakhsh Oriental Library, Patna.
- Two Urdu masnavis (narrative poems) titled Masnavi-e-Kunvar are housed in the Asiatic Society of Bengal. One carries a publication date of 1848, while the other is dated 1846.
- He also wrote a scholarly treatise on the Vedantic era of Hindu civilization, though this work is now considered rare.
- According to Wafa Rashidi, Kunvar also launched a weekly journal titled Nizām-e-Shamsī in 1830.
