= Rajaram Jaipuria =

Indian industrialist

Rajaram Jaipuria (16 January 1934 – 17 January 2015) was an Indian industrialist, educationist, and author. He was MA, Ph D in Economics. He was the founding chairman and managing director of Ginni Group (Ginni Filaments Limited) and Seth Anandram Jaipuria Education Society. He was also the ex-Chairman of the Indian Cotton Mills Federation. He managed a number of industries, such as sugar, media, cotton spinning, technical textiles, consumer products, etc.

He had contributed to educational institutions, hospitals, and charitable organizations.

== Family ==
Rajaram Jaipuria belonged to a very reputed family from Nawalgarh, Rajasthan. He was the son of Late Jamuna Devi and Padma Bhushan Late Seth Mungturam Jaipuria. He was married to Suniti. He and Suniti had three children Archana, Shishir, and Sharad..

Seth Anandram Jaipuria was the grandfather of Rajaram.

== Book ==
- Textile Legend Unravels, Genre: Biography was published in 2007

== Companies ==
=== Swadeshi Cotton Mills Kanpur ===
Swadeshi Cotton Mills Kanpur partnered by Jaipurias was one of the six mills taken over by NTC in 1978. Swadeshi was one of the oldest and biggest cotton spinning mill of that time in India. It was established in 1911, it had spindles around one lac and 2000 looms with strength of more than 9000 employees.

=== Pioneer ===
Pioneer was an English daily possessed by Jaipurias.

=== Ginni Filaments Limited ===
He was a textile professional and the companies he established are catering to modern-day needs and luxuries both such as regular garments to PPE.

- Ginni Filaments Limited a vertically integrated company of hosiery goods with (a hundred percent export orient unit when started) of super fine cotton yarns was promoted by Dr. Raja Ram Jaipuria in 1990.
- Ginni International Limited was another textile company under his flagship, established in 1995.
- Ginni Filaments Limited (A unit of spunlace nonwoven fabrics) at Panoli, Gujarat.

== Schools and colleges ==
- Seth Anandram Jaipuria School Kanpur
- Seth Anandram Jaipuria School Lucknow
- Seth Anandram Jaipuria School Ghaziabad
- Seth Anandram Jaipuria College Kolkata

== Charitable organisations ==
=== Jaipuria Bhawans (Dharamashalas) ===
- Seth Anandram Jaipuria Bhawan, Vrindavan.
- Seth Anandram Jaipuria Bhawan, Haridwar.
- Seth Anandram Jaipuria Bhawan, Chitrakoot.

=== Hospital ===
- Jaipuria Hospital Nawalgarh, Rajasthan.

== Tributes ==
In his memory, the President of India, Ram Nath Kovind released a Coffee Table book on 'Ram Darshan' during his visit to Chitrakoot on 8 January 2018 in Madhya Pradesh's Satna district.

- Memorial lecture 2019 by the Vice President of India Venkaiah Naidu.
- Memorial lecture 2020 by the Cabinet Minister Shri Nitin Gadkari.
- Memorial lecture 2022 by the Swami Swaroopananda head of Chinmaya Mission.

== See also ==
- Seth Anandram Jaipuria College
- Seth M.R. Jaipuria Schools
- Seth M.R.Jaipuria School, Lucknow
- Jaipuria Vidyalaya
