= List of roads in Kolkata =

Roads, avenues and streets in Kolkata

Kolkata (greater) is home to the second largest road network in India, only after New Delhi. As of 2022, total road network in the city's metropolitan area is 4018 km while the city proper has road network of 1850 km. The following is a list of major roads, streets and avenues in the Kolkata (greater).

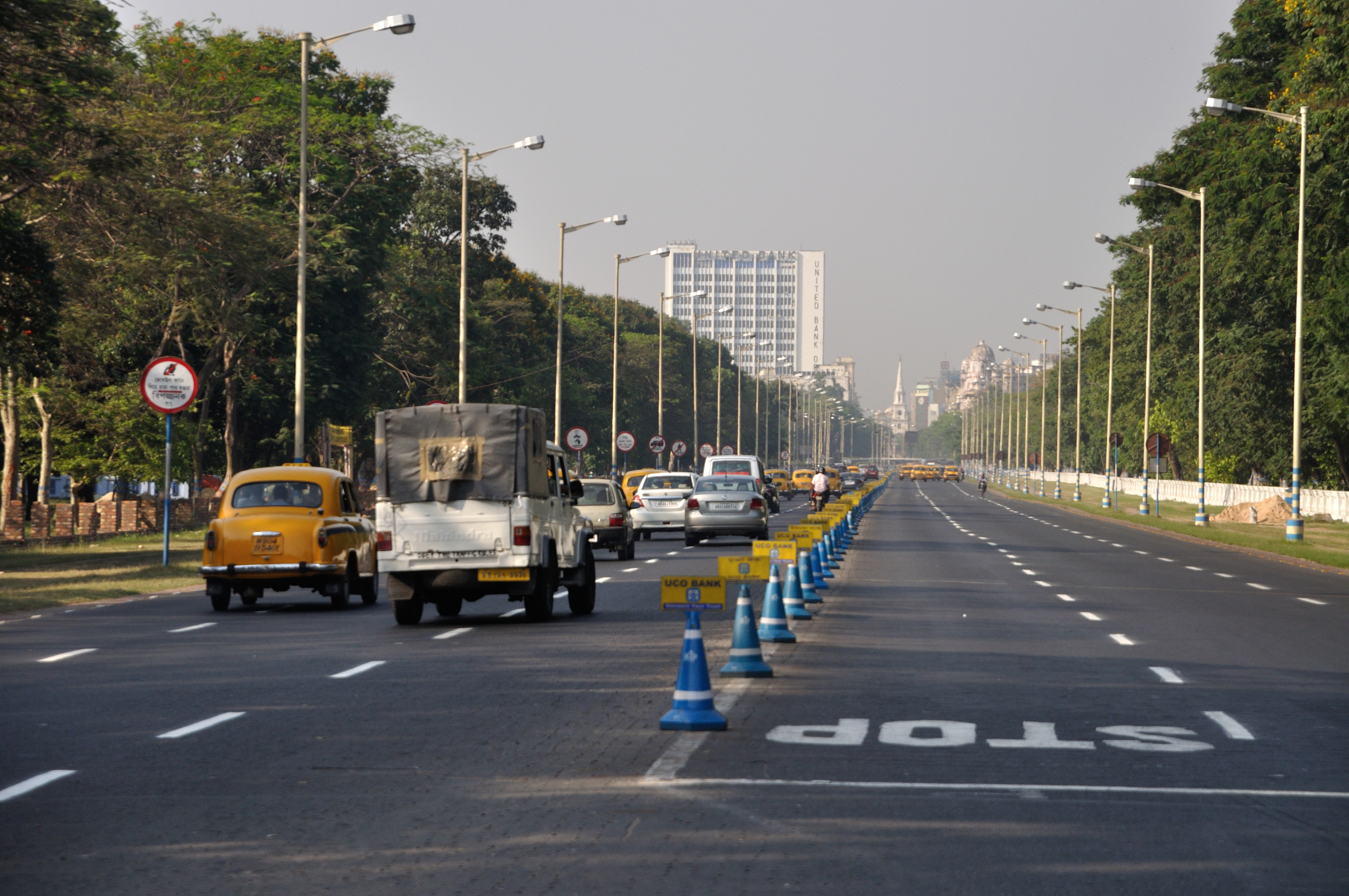
Red Road, major road in Central Kolkata

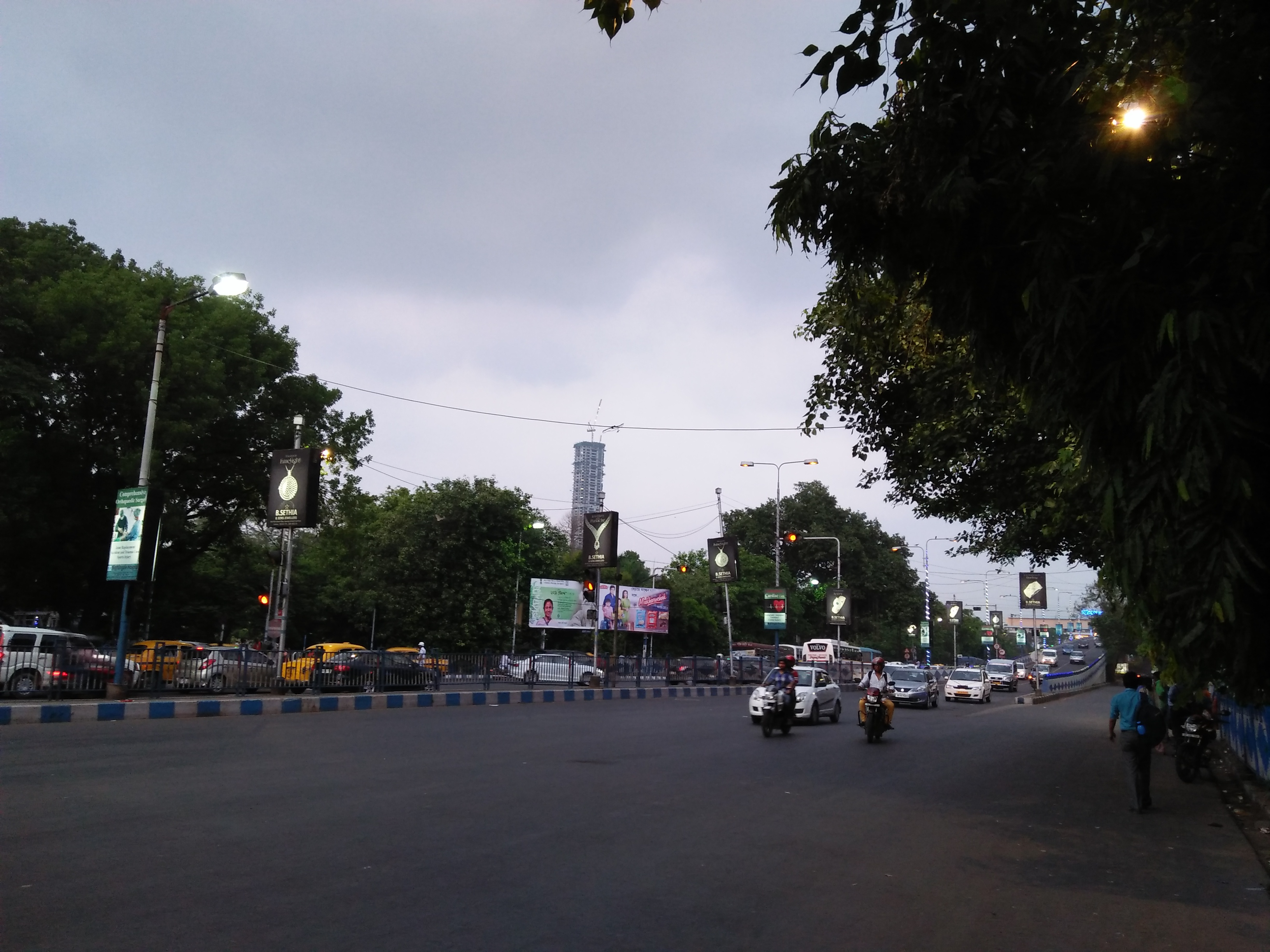
AJC Bose Road, major east-west road of Kolkata

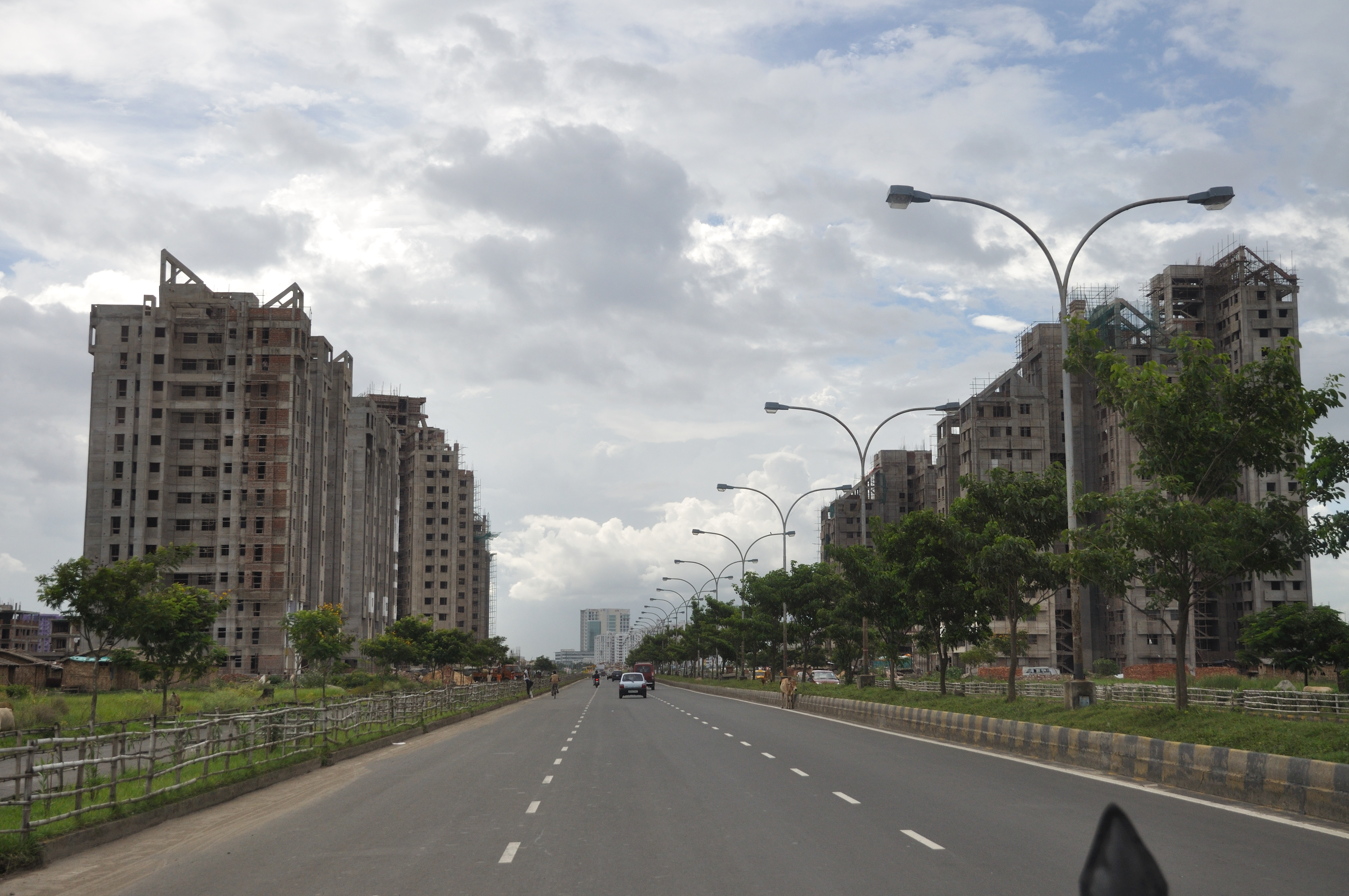
Biswa Bangla Sarani, one of the busiest road in Kolkata metropolitan area

== Major North-South roads in Kolkata city ==
This list covers major North-South roads in the Kolkata city proper as well as in Kolkata Metropolitan Area.

Road/ avenue name	Part of	Endpoints	Laning	Length (km)	Region	Ref(s)
Eastern metropolitan bypass	SH 3	North end: Ultadanga (becomes VIP Road); South end: Garia (Kolkata city); Baruipur (greater Kolkata)	6-8 laned from Ultadanga to Kamalgachi; 4 laned from Kamalgachi to Baruipur	32	Kolkata city and greater	
Chittaranjan Avenue/ Central Avenue		North end: Sovabazar (becomes Jatindra Mahan Avenue); South end: Esplanade (becomes Chowringhee Road)	6 laned		Kolkata city	
Chowringhee Road		North end: Esplanade (becomes Chittaranjan Avenue); South end: Bhawanipur (becomes Ashutosh Mukherjee Road)	6-8 laned		Kolkata city	
Ashutosh Mukherjee Road and Shyama Prasad Mukherjee Road		North end: Bhawanipur (becomes Chowringhee Road); South end: Tollygunge (becomes Mahanayak Uttam Kumar Sarani)	4-6 laned		Kolkata city	
Mahanayak Uttam Kumar Sarani		North end: Tollygunge (becomes Shyama Prasad Mukherjee Road); South end: Haridevpur	6-8 laned		Kolkata city	
AJC Bose Road & APC Road	SH 1	North end: Shyambazar; South end: Hastings	6 laned		Kolkata city	
Gariahat Road	SH 1	North end: Ballygunge; South end: Jadavpur	4-6 laned		Kolkata city	
Raja SC Mullick Road	SH 1	North end: Jadavpur; South end: Garia	4 laned		Kolkata city	
Jessore Road		North end: Belgachia (Kolkata city proper); Barasat (Greater Kolkata); South end: Shyambazar	2-4 laned		Kolkata city and greater	
Strand Road		North end:Bagbazar; South end: Watgunge	2-4 laned upto Babughat and then 6 laned		Kolkata city	
Red Road		North end: Esplanade; South end: Watgunge(becomes Khidirpur Road)	6 laned		Kolkata city	
Khidirpur Road		North end: Watgunge(becomes Red Road); South end: Khidirpur	4 laned		Kolkata city	
Diamond Harbour Road	NH 12	North end: Khidirpur (Merges with Khidirpur road); South end: Joka (Kolkata city proper); Diamond Harbour (Greater Kolkata)	4-6 laned			Kolkata city and greater
Netaji Subash Chandra Bose Road	SH 1	North end: Tollygunge (becomes Mahanayak Uttam Kumar Sarani); South end: Garia (Kolkata city proper); Baruipur (Greater Kolkata)	2 laned		Kolkata city	Kolkata city and greater
Sarat Bose Road		North end:Minto Park; South end: Lake Gardens	4 laned	3.5	Kolkata city	

== Major East-West roads in Kolkata city ==
Road/ avenue name	Part of	Endpoints	Laning	Length (km)	Region	Ref(s)
AJC Bose Road		East end: Hastings; West end: Park Circus	4 laned		Kolkata city	
JBS Haldane Avenue		East end: Park Circus; West end: Dhapa	6 laned		Kolkata city	
Rashbehari Avenue		East end: Alipore(Chetla); West end: Ruby	4 laned		Kolkata city	
Prince Anwar Shah Road and Kalikapur Road extension		East end: Tollygunge; West end: Kalikapur	4 laned		Kolkata city	
Vivekananda Road		East end: Girish Park; West end: Manicktala	4 laned		Kolkata city	
Maniktala Main Road		East end: Maniktala; West end: Kakurgachi	4 laned		Kolkata city	
Beleghata Main Road		East end: Sealdah; West end: Beleghata	2 laned		Kolkata city	
Taratala Road		East end: Garden Reach; West end: Taratala Xing	2-4 laned		Kolkata city	
MG Road		East end: Burrabazar; West end: Sealdah	4 laned		Kolkata city	
Southern Avenue		East end: Rashbehari; West end: Golpark	4 laned		Kolkata city	

== Branch roads, minor roads and connectors in Kolkata city ==
- Aurobindo Sarani: connects Ultadanga with Shobhabazar
- Raja Nabakrishna Street
- Bidhan Sarani: connects Shyambazar and College Street, runs parallel to Chittaranjan Avenue
- Amherst Street: connects Shyambazar and MG Road, runs parallel to Chittaranjan Avenue
- College Street
- Bepin Behari Ganguly Street
- Netaji Subhash Road
- Hare Street
- Picnic Garden Road
- Sudder Street
- Camac Street
- Mirza Ghalib Street
- Shakespeare Sarani
- Gobinda Chandra Khatik Road
- Pulin Khatik Road
- Ballygunge Circular Road
- Gurusaday Dutt Road

== Notable streets and lanes in Kolkata city ==
- Bentick Street
- Dacres Lane
- Ezra Street
- Ho Chi Minh Sarani
- Lovelock Street
- Rabindra Sarani
- Raja Nabakrishna Street
- Zakaria Street

== Major roads in Kolkata metropolitan area ==
Road/ avenue name	Part of	Route	Laning	Length (km)	Ref(s)
Biswa Bangla Sarani		Haldiram (merges with VIP Road) to Garia	6 laned	33	
Kalyani Expressway		Nimta to Kalyani	6 laned	44	
Kona Expressway	NH12	Vidyasagar Setu to Nibra through Santragachi	4 laned	7.3	
Belghoria Expressway	AH1 NH12	Dakshineswar to Rajchandrapur	4 laned	16	
Barrackpore Trunk Road	SH1 SH2	Dakshineswar to Barrackpore	6 laned	18	
Budge Budge Trunk Road		Taratala to Budge Budge	4 laned from Taratala to Batanagar; 2 laned from Batanagar to Budge Budge		
