= Motilal Ray =

Bengali actor, director, and writer

- মতিলাল রায়
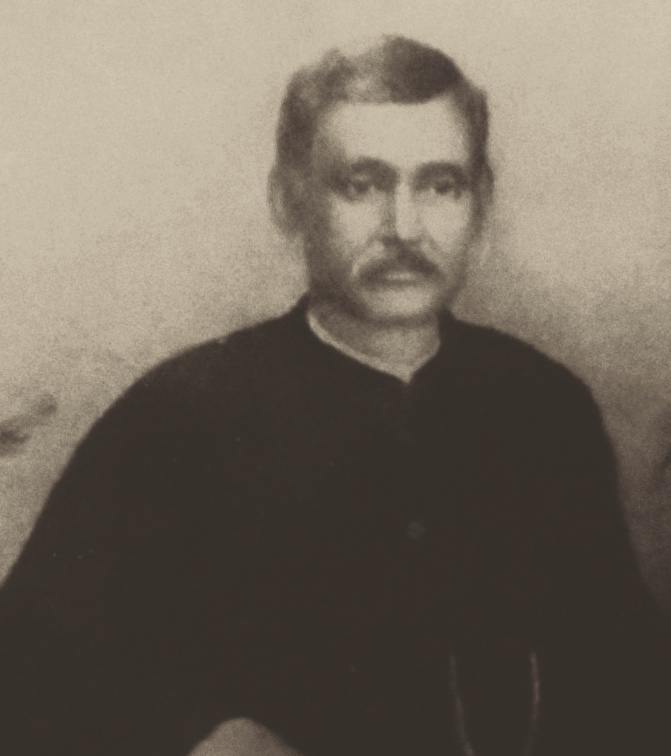
- Born: February 1843; Bhatsala in Bardhaman, Bengal Presidency, British India (now Purba Bardhaman)
- Died: 1908
- Occupations: Actor, director and writer

Motilal Ray (February, 1843 - 1908) also known as Mati Ray was a Bengali actor, director, and writer. He popularized the Jatra Gan by composing simple fluent and elegant ballads. He revived the old tradition in a new way. Under his influence, Krishna Lila Jatra came to be known as ‘Puratan' old.

== Biography ==
=== Early days ===
Motilal Ray was born on 21 Magh of 1249 Bangabda (in February 1843) in the village of Bhatsala in Bardhaman district (now in Purba Bardhaman district). His father was Manohar Ray and mother was Kashishwari debi. After starting his studies in the village school, he came to Nabadwip and completed his primary studies from Nabadwip Missionary School. He later studied in Barasat High School.

=== Professional career ===
With the help of Madhab Chowdhury, Motilal Ray began his career as a teacher in the Missionary School in Nabadwip. Within a few days, he got a service at Jorasanko police station and went there. And within a few months he got a good job in Calcutta G.P.O. and moved there.

He had a hobby of writing poetry since childhood. When he met Ishwar Gupta, the editor of Sambad Prabhakar, one day he got a chance to write poetry there. Later, he got a chance to write for Hari Narayan Babu's Jatra Dal. Then he began to earn and acquired a great reputation by holding Jatra performances with Hari Narayan. Two plays of Motilal ‘‘Tarani Sen Badh’’ and ‘‘Ram Bano Bash’’ or ‘‘Ram Biday’’ were performed in Hari Narayan's Jatra.

In 1873, Motilal formed his own Jatra Party in Nabadwip as Nabadwip Banga Gitabhinay Sampraday. His troupe was more popularly known as Motirayer Dol or Moti Ray's Troupe. Motilal Ray changed the style and narratives of Jatra, introducing a modern identity. He transformed Jatra much closer to the style of theater, introducing Geetabhinoy (acting through singing) in Jatra.

== Bibliography ==
=== Plays and Jatra ===
Ramayani

- Tarani Sen Badh (Plays)
- Ram Banabas or Ram Biday (1873)
- Sitaharan (1878)
- Ram Raja
- Lakkhman Bhojan
- Raban Badh
- Sita Anneshan
- Ram Parinata

About Mahabharat

- Bharat Milan or Bharat Agaman (1888)
- Draupadir Vastra Haran (1881)
- Pandab Nirbasan
- Bhishma's Sharashajjya
- Karnabadh
- Yudhusthirer Rajyabhishek (1900)
- Yudhusthirer Ashbmamedh

Krishnalila

- Kaliya Sarpadaman
- Brojolila (1894)
- Gayasurer Haripadpadnia Labh

Others Mythology

- Jagannath's Māhātmya or Kṣētradhāmēra Māhātmya
- Subachani Māhātmya

Loukik Kahini and Brotokotha

- Nemai Sannyasa
- Vijay Chandi (1880)
- Mahalila
