= Shobhabazar Lal Mandir =

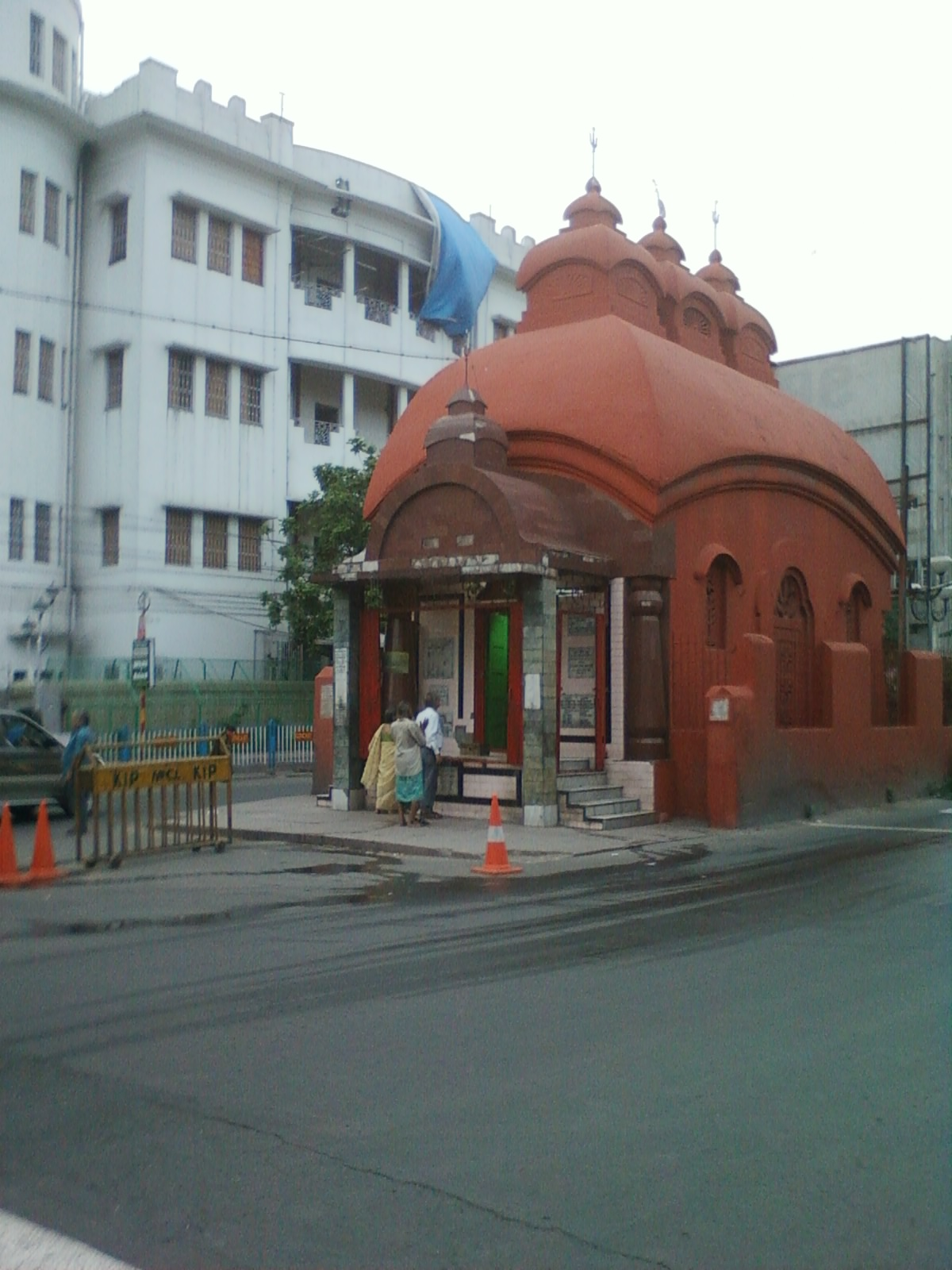
- Lal Mandir

Religion
- Affiliation: Hinduism
- District: Kolkata

Location
- Location: Shobhabazar
- State: West Bengal
- Country: India

Architecture
- Type: Chala Style

The Lal Mandir is an old Hindu temple in the locality of Shobhabazar, at the crossing of Raja Nabakrishna Street and Jyotindra Mohan Avenue of Kolkata, India. It is said to be built by the Raja of Shobhabazar. It is located near Sobhabazar Metro Station entrance.
