= Mungtu Ram Jaipuria =

Indian philanthropists, industrialist and educationist

- Born: Uttar Pradesh, India
- Occupations: Social worker, educationist, industrialist
- Known for: Seth M.R. Jaipuria Schools
- Children: Rajaram Jaipuria
- Awards: 1971 Padma Bhushan

Mungtu Ram Jaipuria (1901–1978) was an Indian social worker, industrialist and educationist and the founder of Seth M.R. Jaipuria Schools. The Government of India awarded him Padma Bhushan, the third highest Indian civilian award, in 1971.

== Family ==
He was the son of Seth Anandaram Jaipuria who belonged to Nawalgarh but migrated to Kolkata and Kanpur later.

== Industries ==
He managed several industries, such as sugar mills, textile spinning, and weaving, etc. He partnered with one of the oldest textile mills in India. Swadeshi cotton mills at Kanpur which was acquired by National Textile Corporation in 1978.

== See also ==
- Seth Anandram Jaipuria College
- Seth M.R.Jaipuria School, Lucknow
- Jaipuria Vidyalaya
- Rajaram Jaipuria
