= SAJC =

SAJC may refer to:

- St Andrew's Junior College, a pre-university school in Singapore
- Seth Anandram Jaipuria College, Kolkata, India
- South Australian Jockey Club
