= Sovabazar Raj =

Indian Zamindari Dynasty

Sovabazar Raj Family শোভাবাজার রাজপরিবার
- Zamindari
- Current region: Kolkata, West Bengal, India (Bengal Presidency)
- Founded: 1757; 269 years ago
- Founder: Nabakrishna Deb
- Titles: Maharaja • Raja • Bahadur
- Estate: Palace of Sovabazar
- Dissolution: 1951

The Sovabazar Raj family, seated at Sovabazar Palace in the Indian city of Kolkata, were the Zamindars of Shobhabazar

== Genealogy ==
The clan begins with Maharaja Naba Krishna Deb Bahadur, who left behind two sons, the adopted son Raja Gopimohan Deb (1768) and his own son Raja Raj Krishna Deb. Raja Gopimohan Deb was founder director of Hindu College and founder of famous Dharma Sabha. He offered much precious gold and silver to Maa Kali of Kalighat. A very well known scholar in Urdu, Persian, and English. His son was Radhakanta Deb, whereas Raja Rajkrishna Deb (1782–1823) had eight sons.

- Shiv Krishna
- Kali Krishna
- Debi Krishna
- Apurbo Krishna "Kunvar"
- Kamal Krishna
- Madhab Krishna
- Narendra Krishna Deb

The Zamindari consisted more than half of Sutanuti and thousands of acres of lands in several districts of Bengal (now parts of West Bengal and Bangladesh).

Sovabazar Raj House of Deb
Preceded by None (Title created)	Maharaja of Sovabazar Raj; 1766–1797	Succeeded by Gopimohan Deb (Adopted son; Chhatra Rajbari); Rajkrishna Deb (Biological son; Choto Rajbari)
