= Radhakanta Deb =

Indian scholar and leader of the Calcutta conservative Hindu society

Maharaja Bahadur Radhakanta Deb KCSI
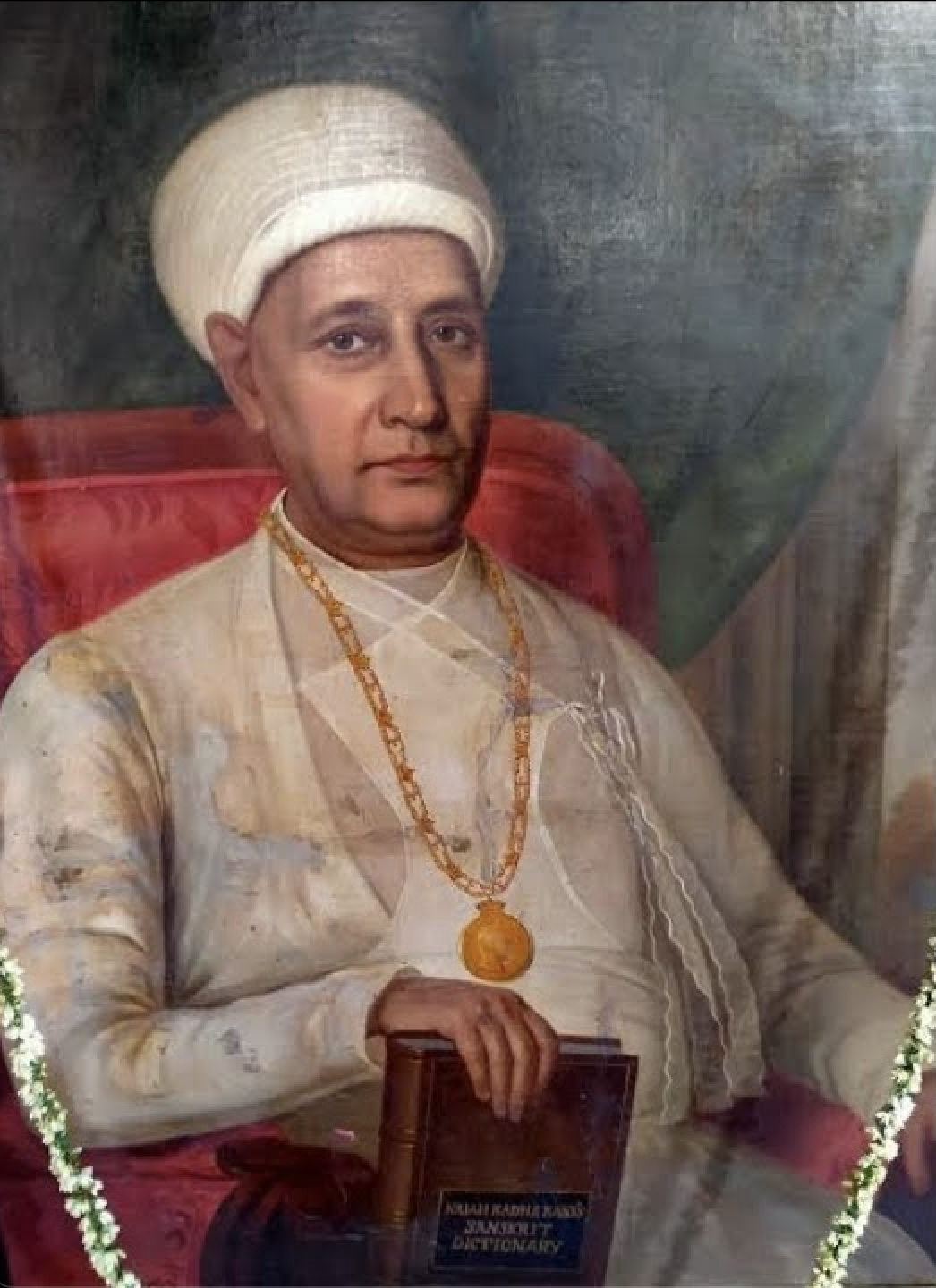
- Radhakanta Deb, c. 1860

3rd Maharaja of Sovabazar
- Preceded by: Raja Gopimohan Deb
- Succeeded by: Raja Narendra Krishna Deb

Personal details
- Born: 10 March 1784 Calcutta, Bengal Presidency, British India (now Kolkata, India)
- Died: 19 April 1867 (aged 83) Calcutta, Bengal Presidency, British India

Raja Sir Radhakanta Deb Bahadur KCSI (10 March 1784 – 19 April 1867) was a scholar and a leader of the Calcutta conservative Hindu society, son of Gopimohan Deb of Shovabazar Raj who was the adopted son and heir of Maharaja Nabakrishna Deb of Shovabazar Raj.

== Life ==
An accomplished scholar, Radhakanta was proficient in Sanskrit, Persian and Arabic. He published Shabda Kalpadruma, a Sanskrit language dictionary. Hara Kumar Tagore another contemporary Sanskrit scholar and scion of Tagore family had assisted him in compiling Shabda Kalpadruma. He also wrote articles that were published in Ishwar Chandra Gupta's newspaper Sambad Prabhakar.

Radhakanta Deb always showed a marked interest in promoting education, particularly English education among the Hindus; he also advocated female education. Radhakanta Deb was actively involved in the establishment and activities of the Calcutta School Book Society in 1817 and the Calcutta School Society in 1818. Radhakanta was an active member of the Agricultural and Horticultural Society of India since its establishment in 1818. He was founder-president British Indian Association in 1851, a position he held till his death. He helped David Hare and funded founding of the Hindu College in Calcutta. He was knighted as a Knight Commander of the Order of the Star of India (KCSI) on 24 May 1866, and died barely 11 months later.

Despite his contribution to the cause of education, he was a strong upholder of social conservatism. Although sati was not practised in his own family, he came forward to defend the custom when the Government contemplated its abolition. When Lord William Bentinck's government had finally abolished sati by regulation in December 1829, Radhakanta Deb, along with his conservative Hindu friends, was the leader a society called Dharma Sabha (founded by his father Gopi Mohun Deb), protested against this measure by presenting a petition to the Governor-General on behalf of the orthodox section of the Hindu community.
