= Shobhabazar Rajbari =

Royal palace in India

Sovabazar Rajbari শোভাবাজার রাজবাড়ি
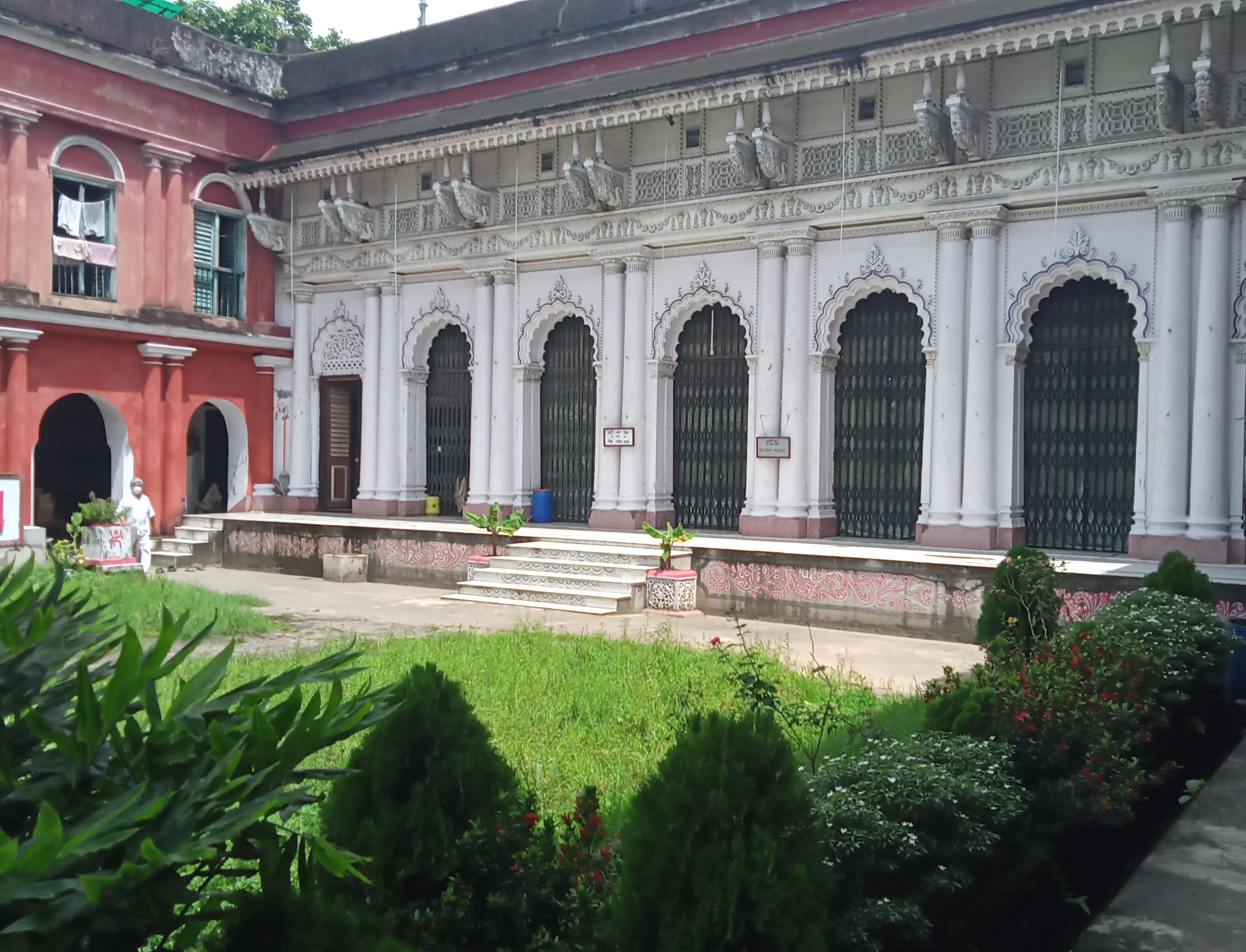
- The Thakurdalan inside the Palace
- Alternative names: Shobhabazar Rajbari

General information
- Status: Residential palace
- Location: 33 to 36 Raja Nabakrishna Street, Kolkata, India
- Construction started: Main building: probably predates 1757; Nat Mandap: 1830s
- Owner: The palace: private; Nat Mandap: Kolkata Municipal Corporation

Shobhabazar Rajbari (Bengali: শোভাবাজার রাজবাড়ি, literally "Shobhabazar Royal Palace") is the palace of the Shobhabazar royal family located in the Indian city of Kolkata.

== History ==
Maharaja Nabakrishna Deb (1733–97), founder of the Shobhabazar Rajbari royal family (at 35), started life as a modest aristocrat but soon amassed enormous wealth in his service to the British, in particular by his role in assisting to topple Siraj ud-Daulah. During his lifetime Maharaja Nabakrishna Deb built two palaces, together the largest palace in Calcutta. The palace at 35 Raja Nabakrishna Street (known as Shobhabazar Rajbari or "Baagh ola Bari - Palace with the lions"), on the northern side of the road, was the one first constructed by him, subsequently inherited by his adopted son from his elder brother Gopimohan and his descendants including his son Raja Radhakanta Deb.

The palace at 33 Raja Nabakrishna Street (known as Choto Rajbari) was built by him when a son was born to him later in life, and was left to his biological son Raja Rajkrishna and his descendants.

== Role in cultural and social life of Bengal ==
- Raja Nabakrishna Deb celebrated Durga Puja in 1757 on a grand scale after the British defeated Siraj-ud-Daulah at the battle of Plassey. Lord Clive and Warren Hastings were in the list of invitees.
- It was here that the first civic reception of Swami Vivekananda after his return from Chicago Parliament of Religions was organised in 1897 by Raja Binoy Deb Bahadur.

== Features ==
Although originally a saat-mahala house the most intact of the remaining spaces is the courtyard with the thakurdalan. A saat khilan thakurdalan with multi-foliate arches supported on pairs of squared pilasters. Pairs of columns with plain shafts rise up between the arches to support the entablature above.

=== The main residence ===
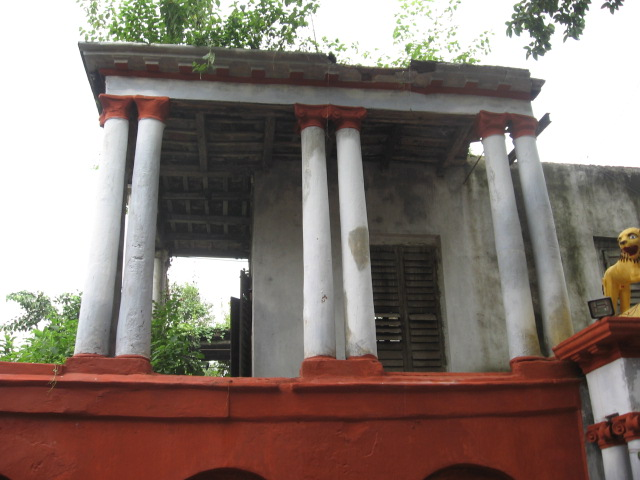
The Nat Mandap.

A large central courtyard with the thakurdalan at the northern end. A paanch khilan takurdalan with multifoil arches supported on compound columns. the double storey wings on either side of the courtyard connect the thakurdalan with the naach ghar to the south. The roof of the naach ghar has fallen through and very little of the superstructure remains.

=== The Nat Mandap ===
A set of eight massive Tuscan columns support a wide projecting cornice at roof level. Two rows of multifoliate arches at the northern end provide access to the nabaratna temple at the rear.

== Gallery ==
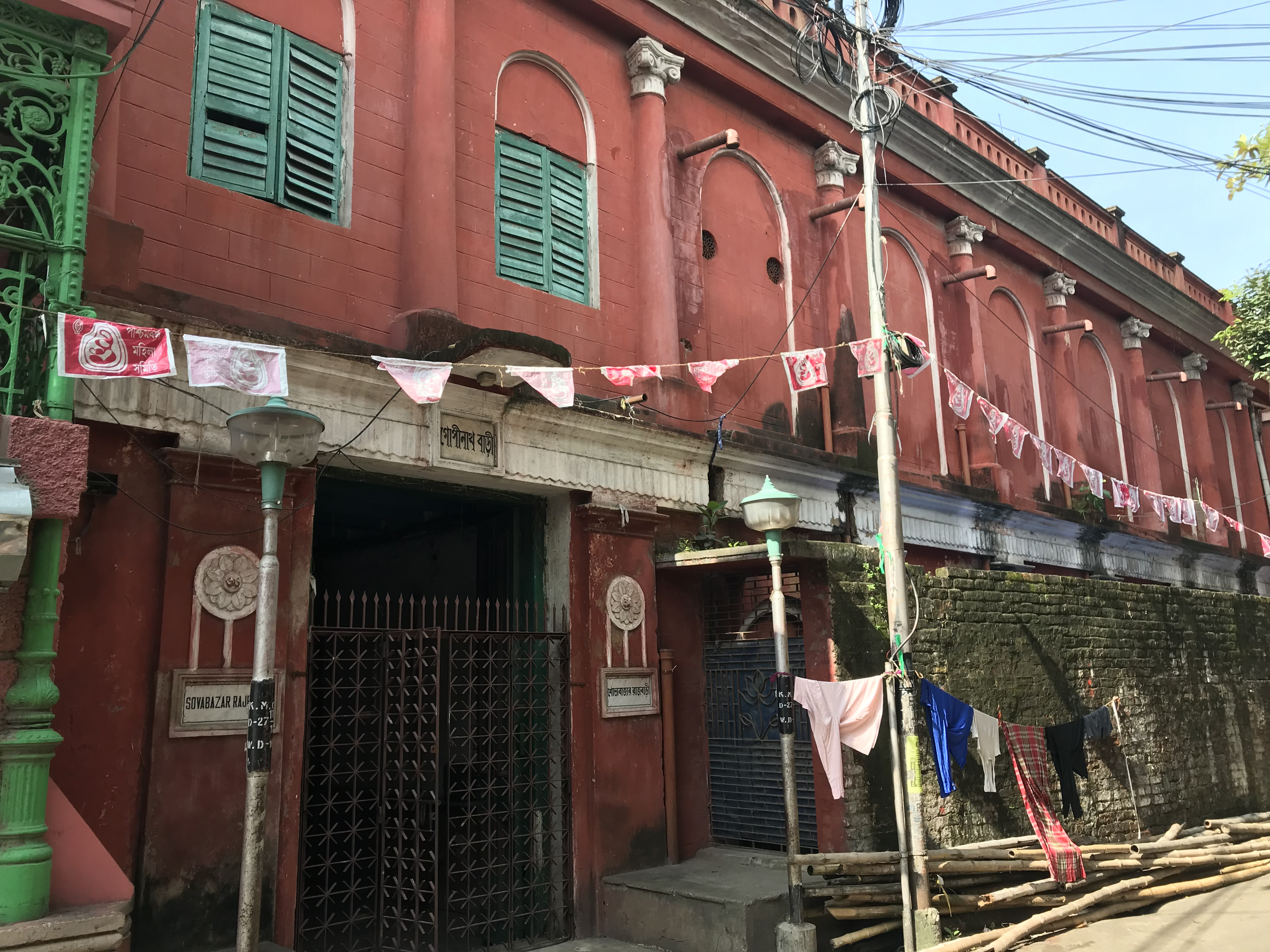
Outside View of Shobhabazar Rajbari

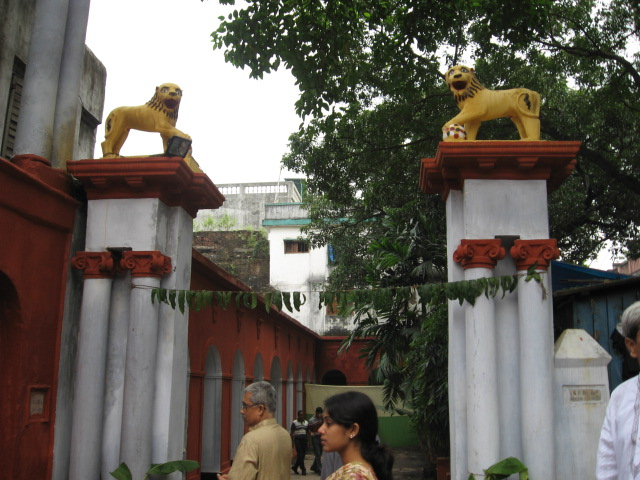
The Main Entrance also called the Singhadwar (literal translation: Entrance or Door with Lions)

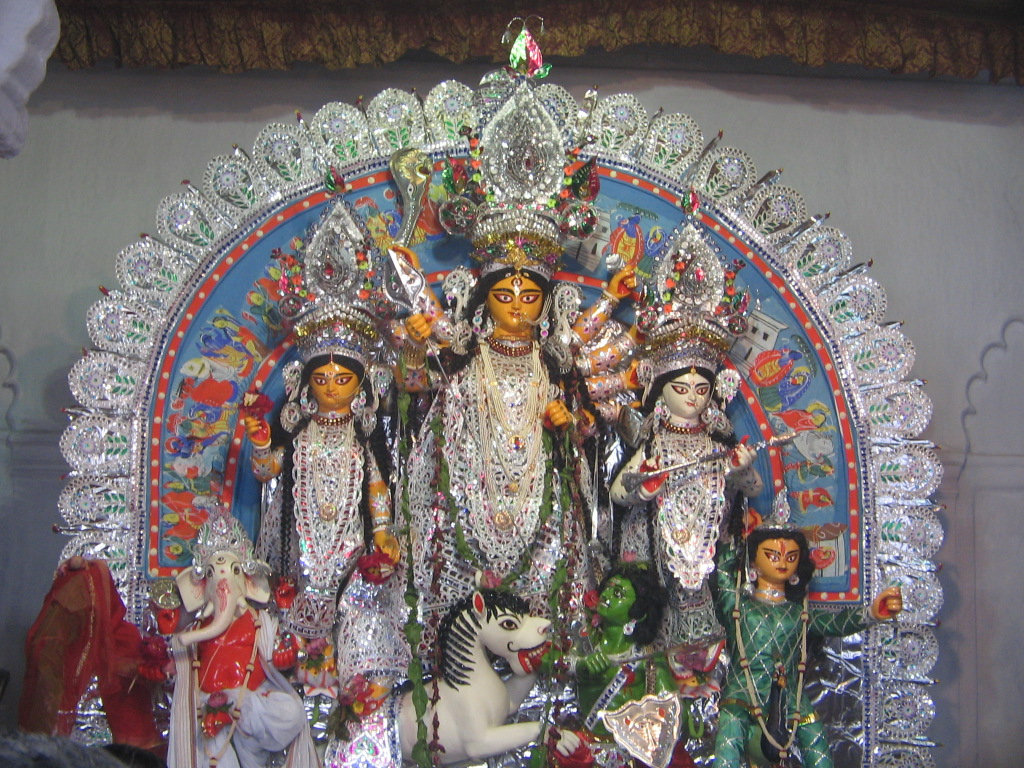
A closer view of the Durga idol at Shobhabazar Rajbari in 2006

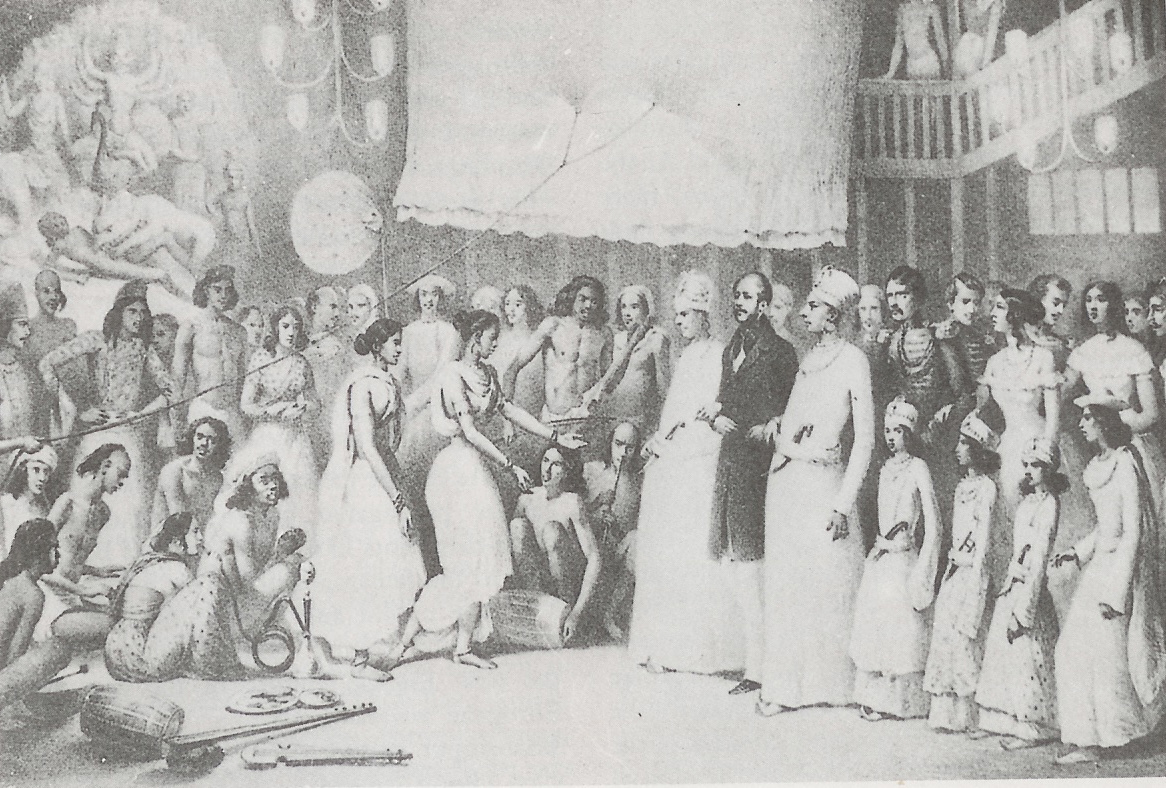
Old painting of Durga Puja in Kolkata, possibly at Shobhabazar

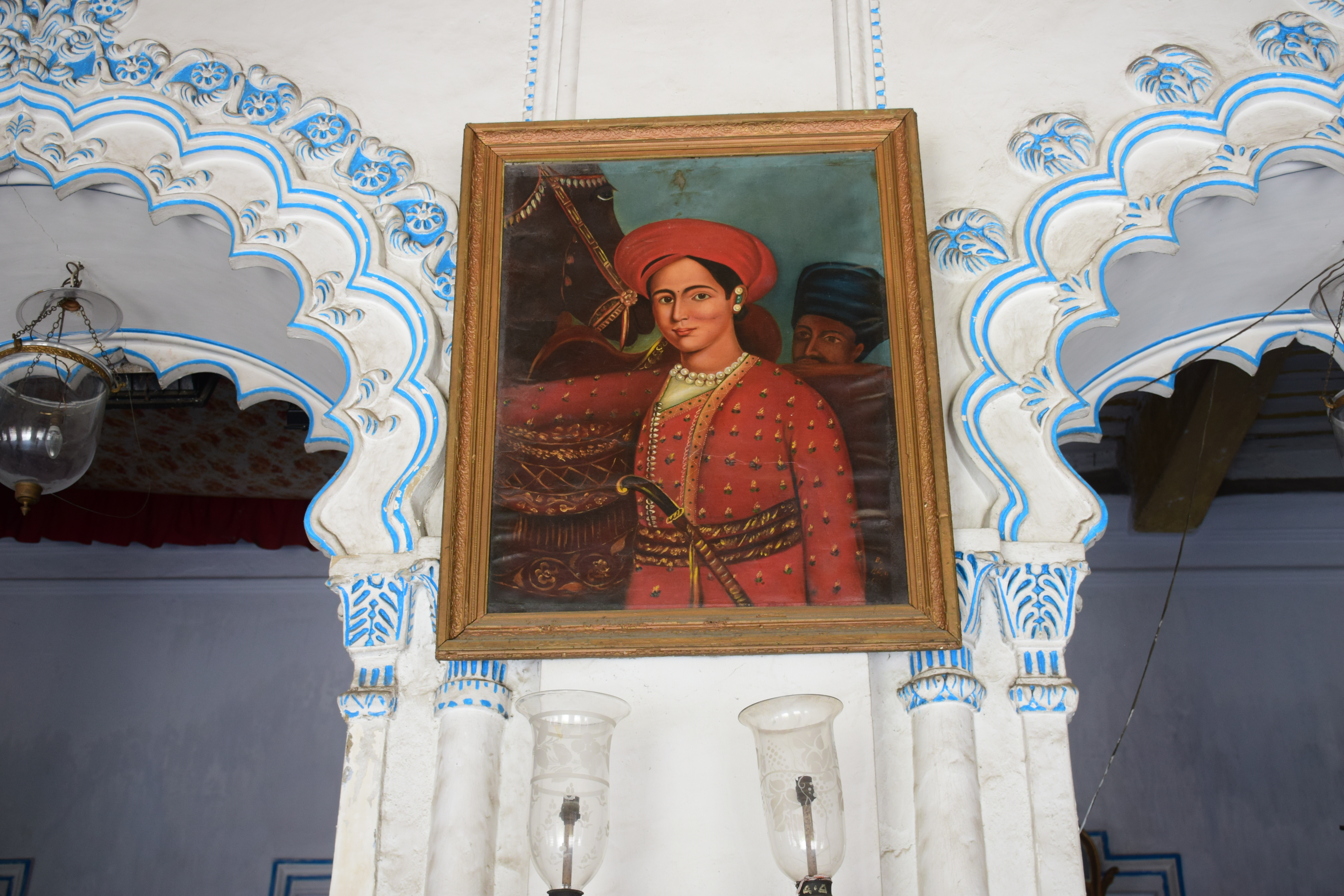
Painting of Raja Rajakrishna Dev at Shobhabazar Rajbari Thakurdalan

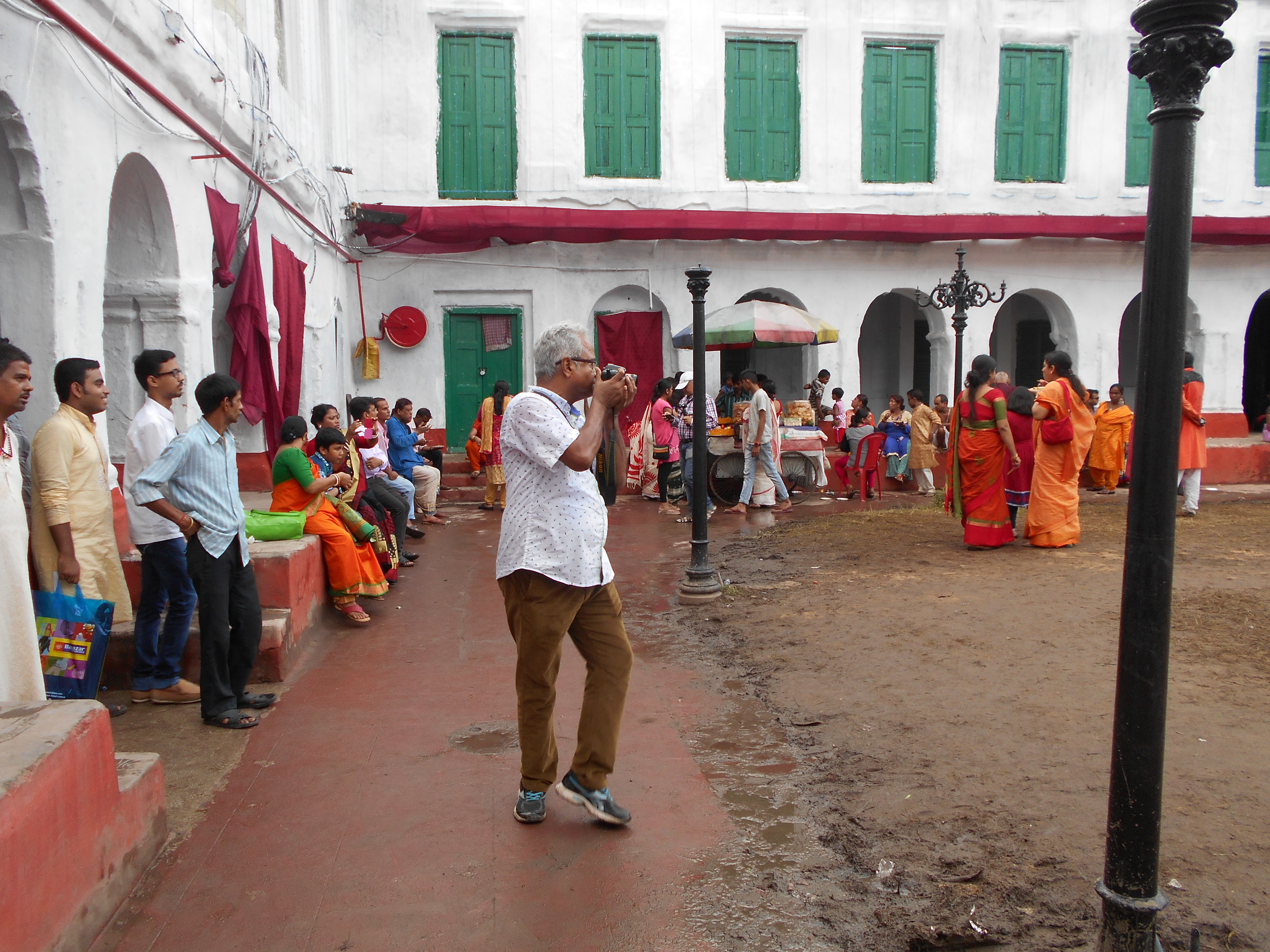
Durga Puja 2016 at Shobhabazar Rajbari

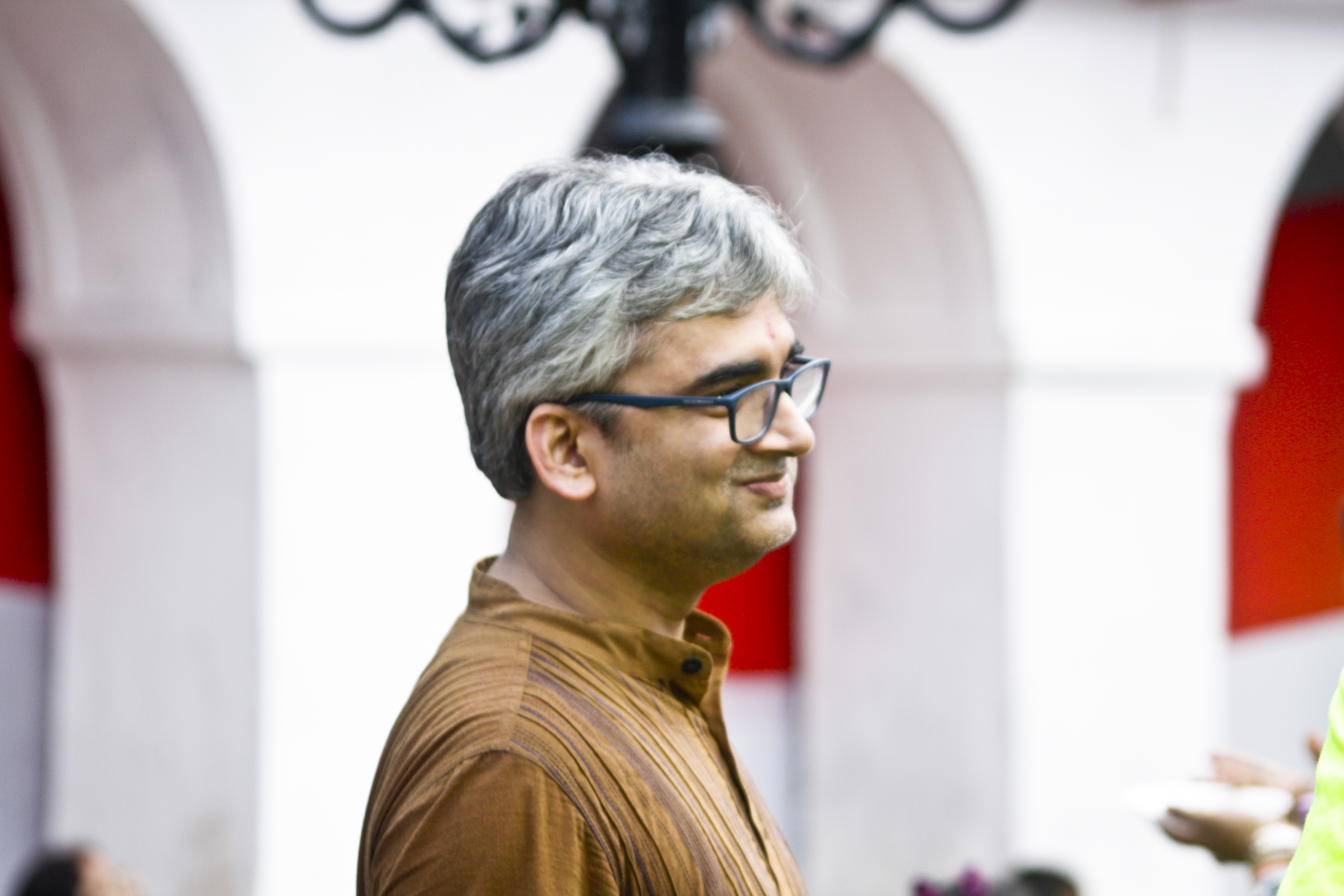
Raja Narayan Deb of Shobhabazar Rajbari

== See also ==
- Shobhabazar
- Nabakrishna Deb
- Umasashi
- Durga Puja of Sovabazar Rajbari
