= Pulin Khatik Road =

Road in Kolkata, India

- Pulin Khatick Road
- Maintained by: Kolkata Municipal Corporation
- Length: 0.65 km (0.40 mi)
- Location: Kolkata, India
- Postal code: 700015
- Nearest metro station: Beliaghata(under construction) and Barun Sengupta(under construction)
- West end: Radhanath Chowdhuri Road (Pottery Road)
- East end: Chingrihata Lane (New Tangra Road)

Pulin Khatik Road is a famous thoroughfare in the city of Kolkata (formerly Calcutta), India. It is 650 metre in length from Radhanath Chowdhuri Road (Pottery Road) to Chingrihata Lane (New Tangra Road) in the Tangra area. The road crosses Gobinda Chandra Khatik Road at Tara Jewellers.

== See also ==
- Streets in Kolkata
