= Ahiritola =

- Neighbourhood
- Location in Kolkata Ahiritola (West Bengal) Ahiritola (India)
- Coordinates: 22.5944°N 88.3549°E
- Country: India
- State: West Bengal
- City: Kolkata
- District: Kolkata
- Metro Station: Sovabazar Sutanuti
- Railway Station: Sovabazar Ahiritola

Government
  - Type: Municipality
  - Body: Kolkata Municipal Corporation
- Elevation: 11 m (36 ft)

Languages
  - Official: Bengali, English
- Time zone: UTC+5:30 (IST)
- PIN: 700005
- Telephone code: +91 33
- Lok Sabha constituency: Kolkata Uttar
- Vidhan Sabha constituency: Shyampukur

Ahiritola (Bengali: আহিরীটোলা) is a neighbourhood of North Kolkata in Kolkata district in the Indian state of West Bengal.

== Transport ==
=== Bus ===
Several buses which enters into Ahiritola are:

- 211 (Ahiritola - Kharibari Bazar)
- 211A (Ahiritola - Langolpota)
- 211B (Ahiritola - Sikharpur)
- 215A (Howrah Stn - Nabadiganta)
