= Gobinda Chandra Khatik Road =

Road in Kolkata, India

- Dr. Ambedkar Sarani
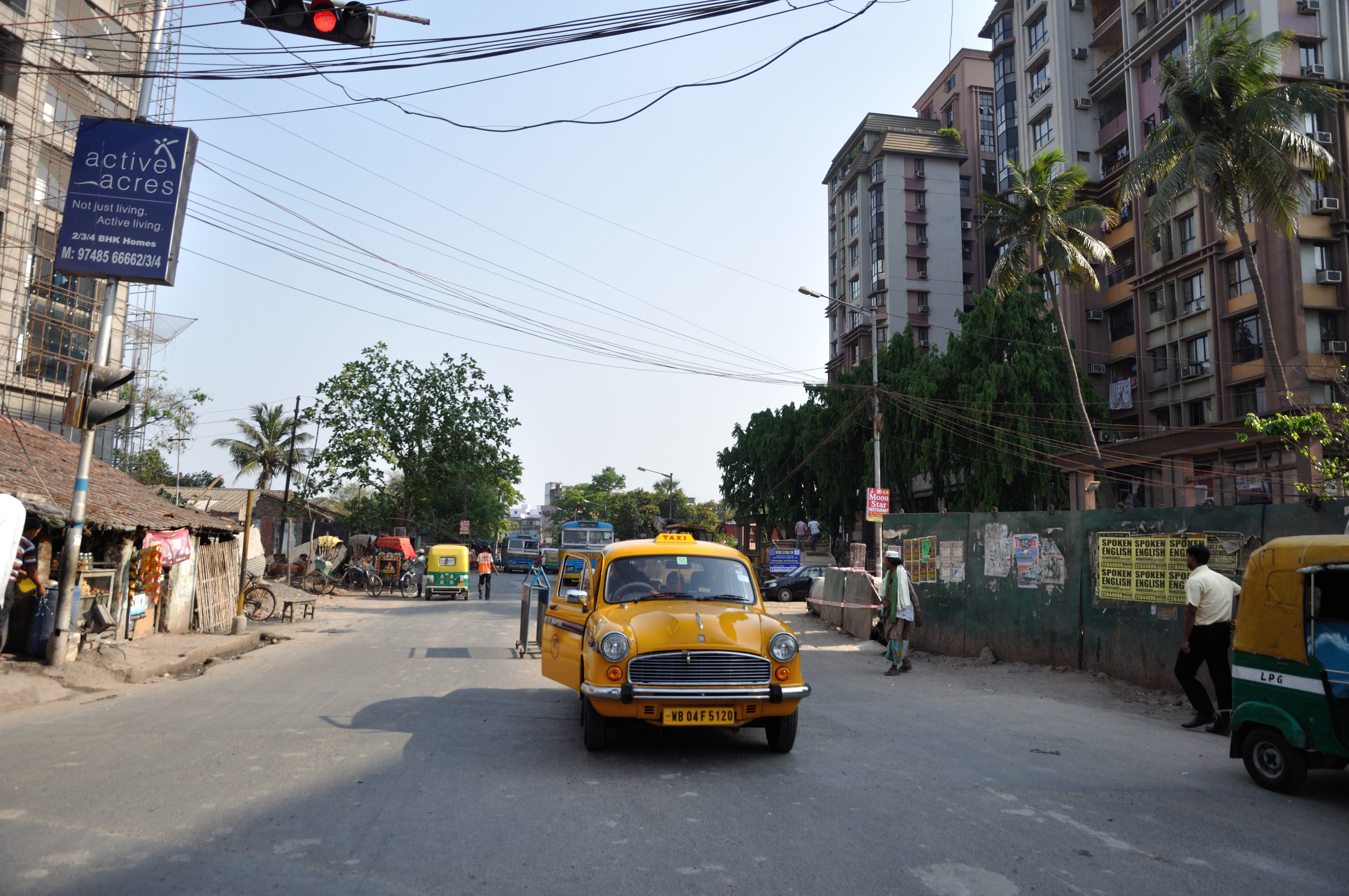
- Interactive map of Gobinda Chandra Khatik Road
- Maintained by: Kolkata Municipal Corporation
- Length: 2.1 km (1.3 mi)
- Location: Kolkata, India
- Postal code: 700015, 700046
- Nearest metro station: Beliaghata(under construction) and Barun Sengupta(under construction)
- Coordinates: 22°33′0.72″N 88°23′7.44″E
- north end: Kilkhana Sunni Masjid
- south end: Kolkata Birds Centre

Construction
- Construction start: uncertain

Gobinda Chandra Khatick Road (formerly Hughes Road) is a famous thoroughfare in the city of Kolkata (formerly Calcutta), India. The road runs past Grace Ling Liang Church, Tangra Police Station, and largely through the China Town areas of Tangra in East Kolkata and crosses Pulin Khatik Road and Christopher Road at separate intersections. Gobinda Chandra Khatik road is 2.1 kilometers in length from the Tangra Slaughterhouse to the Topsia Junction. It demarcated the Eastern Fringes of the city at a time when Chinese operated Tanneries and Leatherworks dominated the area. Nowadays, China Town is a haven of Indo Chinese Fusion food and has crafted a legacy in its own right. Initially called Hughes Road until 1985, the name was renamed to recognise the contribution of Late Gobinda Khatik. Recent Urbanization and rapid growth has rapidly changed the landscape of Tangra and traffic snarls on the once empty road are common. The road is long and narrow and caters to Bi-Directional traffic. Dhangars, a community of Untouchable sanitary workers established their colony along this road. The road falls under Ward no. 56, 59, and 66 of the KMC.

== Gallery ==
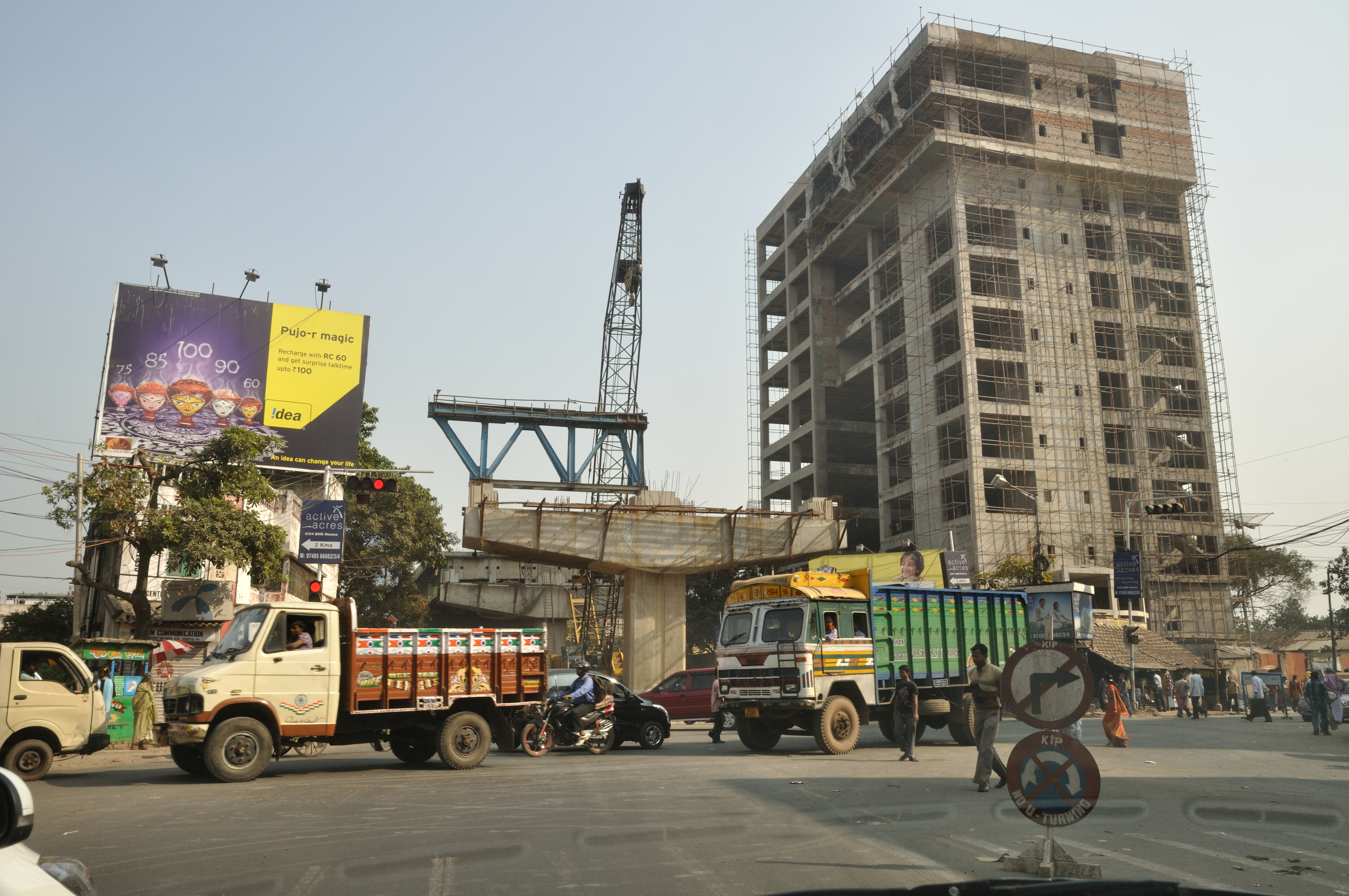
John Burdon Sanderson Haldane Avenue (JBS Haldane Avenue) & Gobinda Chandra Khatik Road Crossing, Kolkata

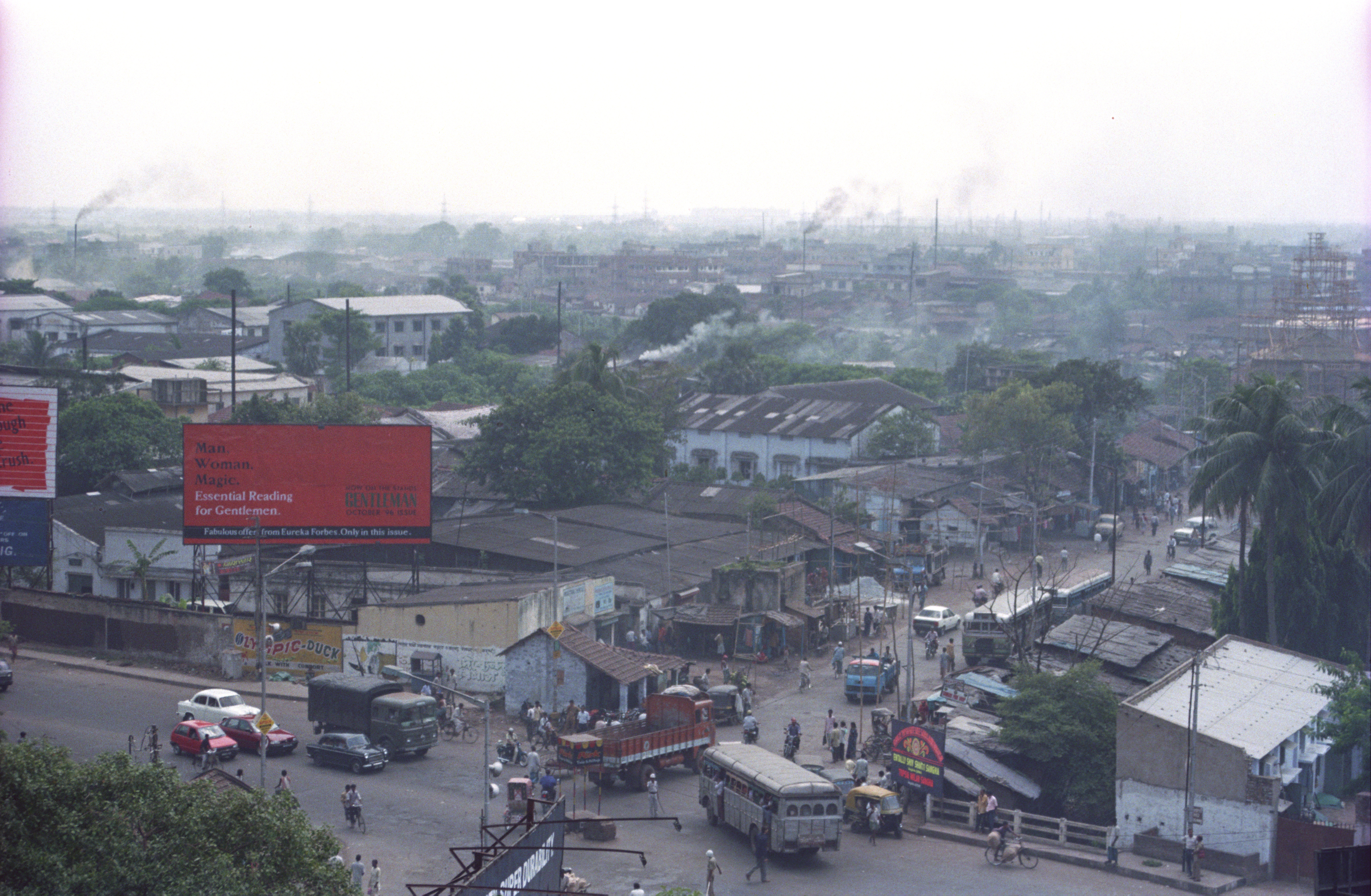
The Topsia crossing or JBS Haldane avenue and Gobinda Chandra Khatik Road crossing of Kolkata. This photograph was taken from the Vishwakarma Building.

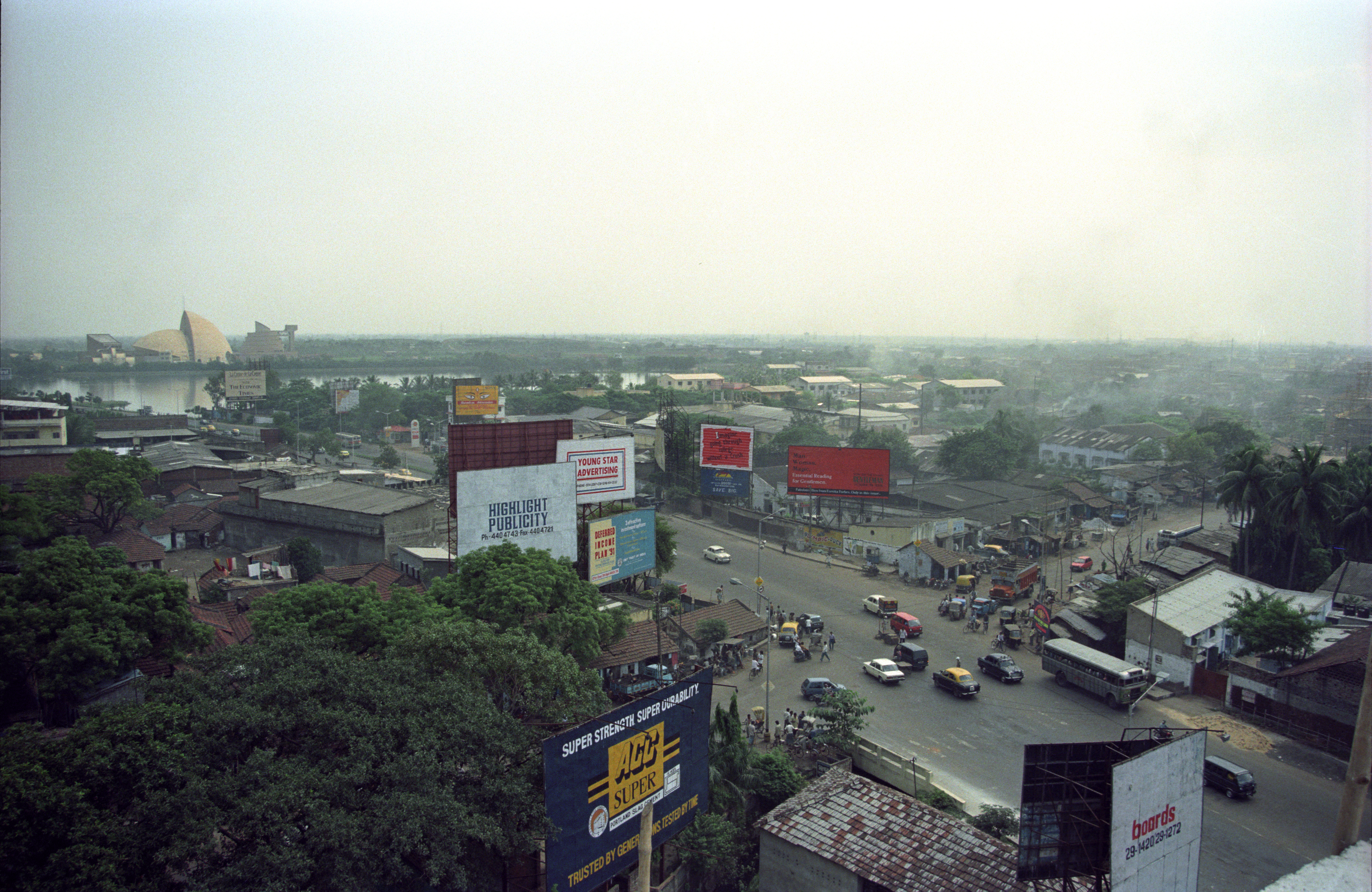
The Topsia crossing or J B S Haldane avenue and Gobinda Chandra Khatik Road crossing of Kolkata, where the Science City is seen in the background. This photograph was taken from the Vishwakarma Building.

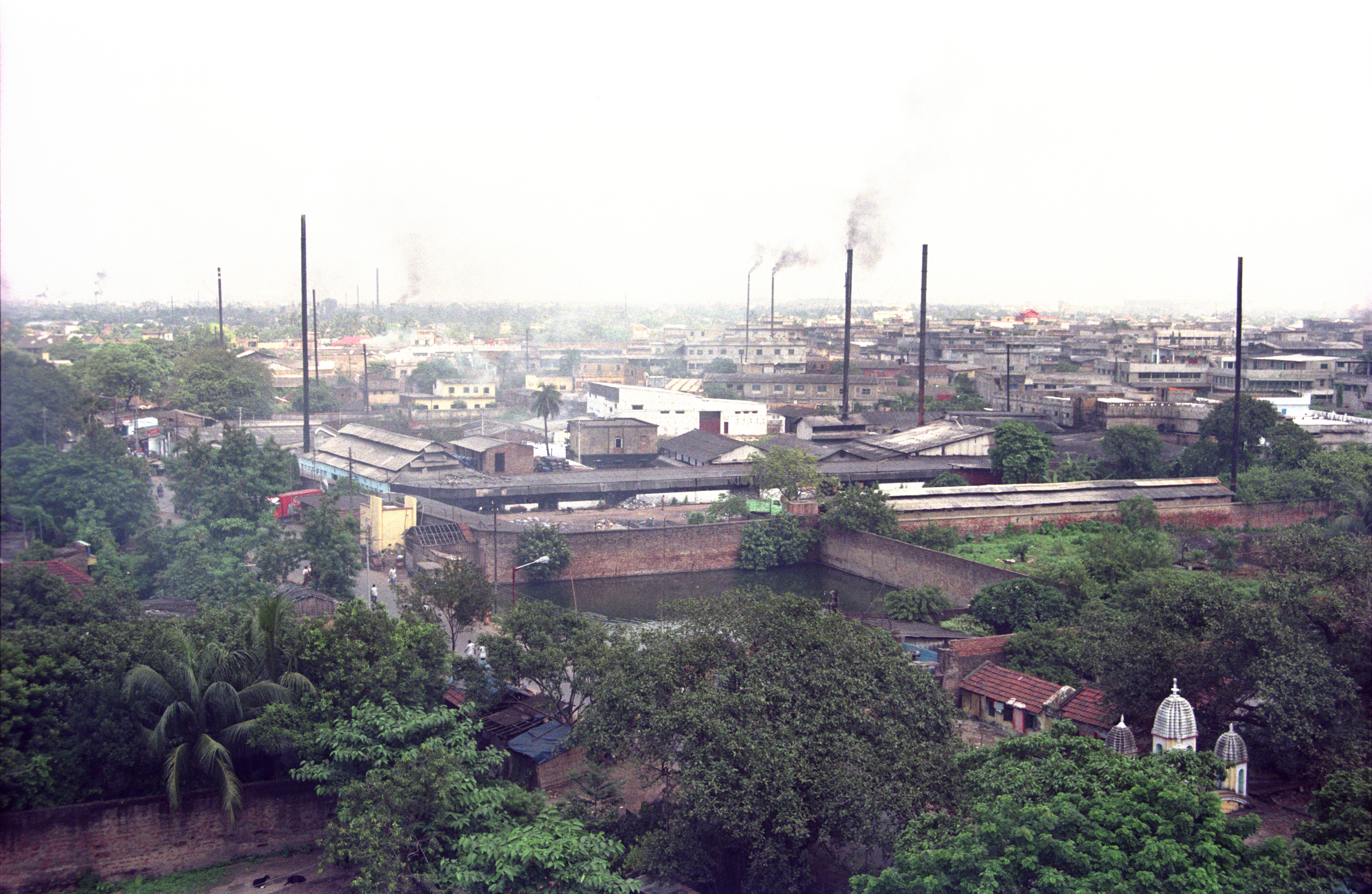
The small leather factories of the Topsia crossing or JBS Haldane avenue and Gobinda Chandra Khatik Road crossing of Kolkata. This photograph was taken from the Vishwakarma Building.

== See also ==
- Streets in Kolkata
