= Raja Nabakrishna Street =

Road in Kolkata, India

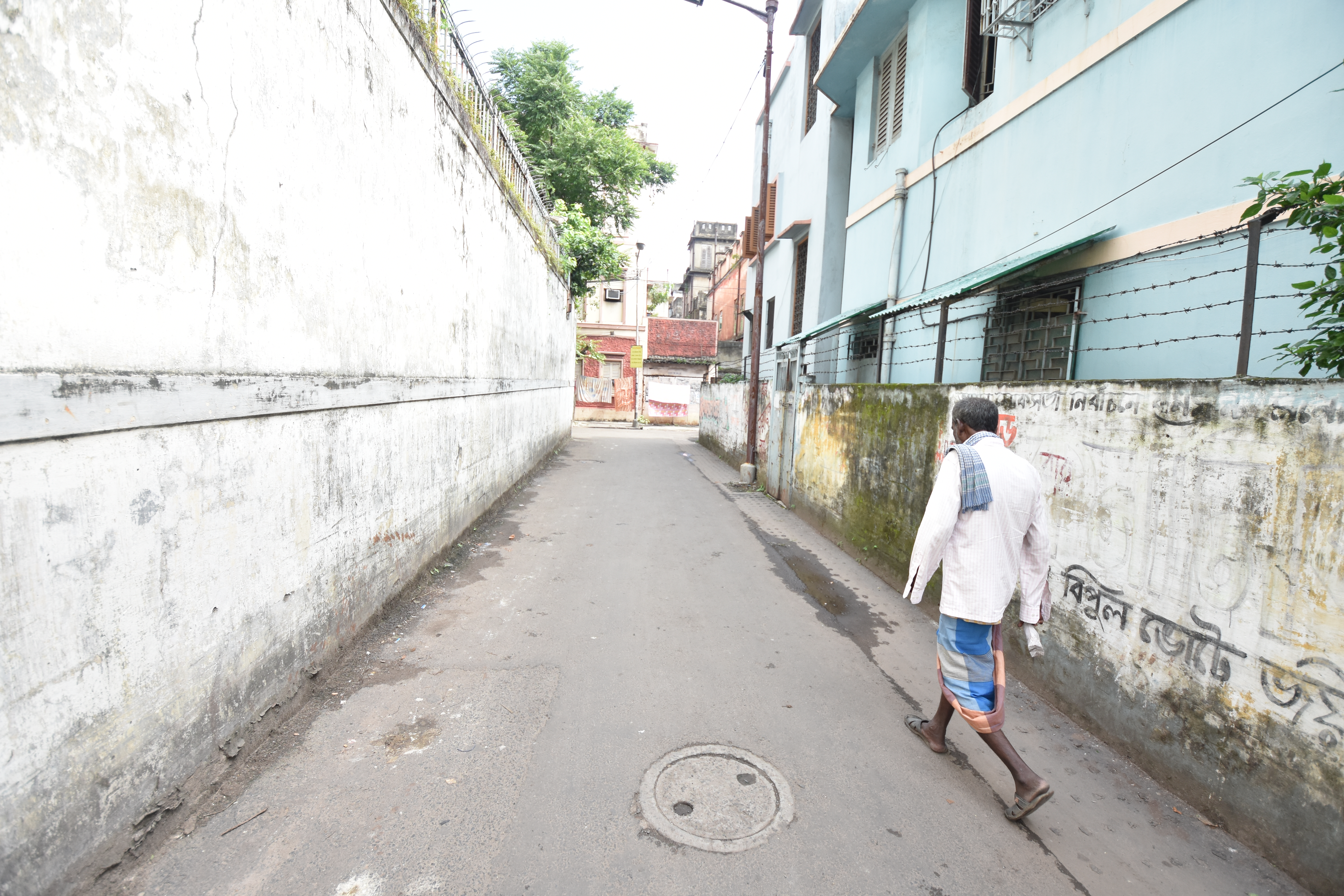
- Maintained by: Kolkata Municipal Corporation
- Location: Kolkata, India
- Postal code: 700004, 700005
- Nearest Kolkata Metro station: Shobhabazar Sutanuti
- east end: Hatibagan
- west end: Shobhabazar

Raja Nabakrishna Street (Bengali: রাজা নবকৃষ্ণ স্ট্রিট): An old street of Kolkata (then Calcutta), situated in the north of the city. This street of North Kolkata connects Aurobindo Sarani at Hatibagan end and Rabindra Sarani at Shobhabazar end. The street was named after Raja Nabakrishna Deb (Bengali: রাজা নবকৃষ্ণ দেব): (1733–1797). Sovabazar Rajbari, Kalikrishna Deb's Rajbari, Seth Anandaram Jaipuria College and Nat Mandir are some important establishments situated in this street. Besides The Rajbari (palaces) of Raja Nabakrishna Deb and Raja Kalikrishna Deb, Sutanuti Utsav, the foundation day of Kolkata, is held from 24 August in the Nat Mandir of Sovabazar Rajbari, organised by the Sutanuti Parishad at then Sutanuti.

== History ==
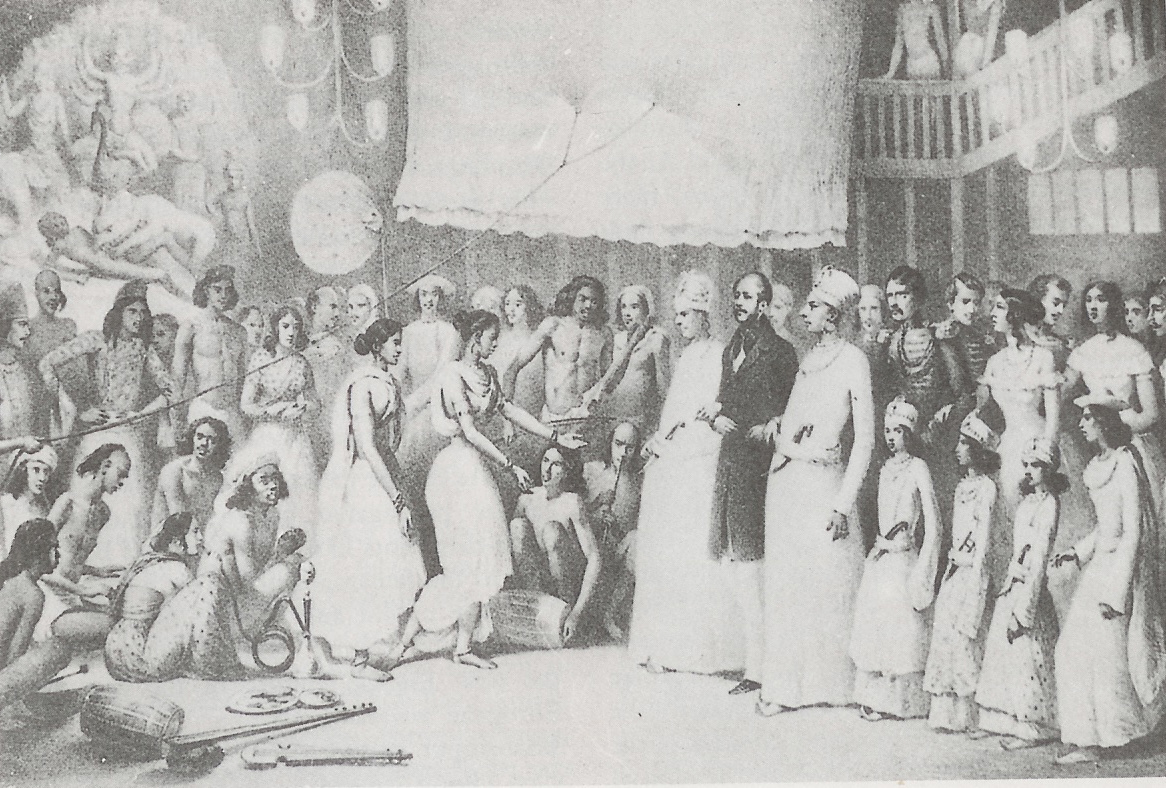
Old painting of Durga Puja in Kolkata, possibly at Sovabazar Rajbari

== Landmarks ==
- Sovabazar Rajbari
- Seth Anandaram Jaipuria College
- Kalikrishna Dev's Rajbari
- Nat Mandir

== Festivals ==
- Durga Puja of Sovabazar Rajbari
- Sutanuti Utsav
