= Sambad Prabhakar =

Bengali daily newspaper founded by Ishwar Chandra Gupta

Sambad Prabhakar সংবাদ প্রভাকর
- Type: Daily newspaper
- Publisher: Ishwar Chandra Gupta
- Editor: Ishwar Chandra Gupta, Ramchandra Gupta, Gopalchandra Mukhopadhyaya, Manindrakrishna Gupta
- Founded: 28 January 1831
- Ceased publication: early 20th century
- Political alignment: none
- Language: Bengali
- Headquarters: Kolkata, Bengal, British India

Sambad Prabhakar (also Sangbad Prabhakar; Bengali: সংবাদ প্রভাকর) was a Bengali daily newspaper founded by Ishwar Chandra Gupta. It began as a weekly newspaper in 1831 and became a daily eight years later in 1839. It was the first Bengali daily newspaper. Sambad Prabhakar covered news on India and abroad and put forward its views on religion, politics, society, and literature. It was influential in the Bengali language and in building public sentiment leading to the indigo revolt.

== History ==
Sambad Prabhakar was the brainchild of Ishwar Chandra Gupta. His patron was Jogendra Mohan Thakur of Pathuriaghata. It began as a weekly newspaper launched on 28 January 1831 (16 Magh 1237BS). As stated, Mr. Thakur was the backbone to this paper and his death caused the paper to close publication in 1832.

In 1836, the newspaper was revived by Ishwar Chandra Gupta and appeared as a tri-weekly on August 10, 1836. The Thakurs of Pathurighata lent a helping hand to the paper again and in 1837 the Sambad Prabhakar became the first Bengali language daily on June 14, 1839.

== Contributors ==
- Kangal Harinath
- Bankim Chandra Chattopadhyay
- Radhakanta Deb
