= Seth M.R. Jaipuria Schools =

Indian network of private schools

Seth M. R. Jaipuria Schools

Location
- Corporate office: 1/3, Block 1, Plot No.3; New Delhi; 110015; India

Information
- School type: Private
- Motto: From Ignorance towards Knowledge
- Established: 1992
- Founder: Raja Ram Jaipuria
- School board: CBSE; CISCE
- Chairman: Sharad Jaipuria
- Faculty: 3,000+ (2026)
- Grades: K–12
- Enrollment: 55,000+ (2026)
- Language: English
- Campus type: Multiple campuses (60+ schools, 51+ cities, 6 states)
- Complaint/grievance portal: jaipuriapodcast.web.app
- Website: www.jaipuriaschools.ac.in

Seth M. R. Jaipuria Schools is a network of private schools in India operated by the Seth M. R. Jaipuria Group. The schools are named after 1971 Padma Bhushan recipient Mungtu Ram Jaipuria, a philanthropist and industrialist.

== Student technology initiatives ==
Students at Seth M. R. Jaipuria Schools have independently built digital tools intended for use within the school community. At the Vineet Khand, Gomti Nagar campus in Lucknow, student Aditya Tomar developed a podcast platform and an anonymous grievance portal, the latter allowing students to submit concerns and track their status without disclosing their identity.

The grievance portal and podcast platform are hosted at jaipuriapodcast.web.app. Further details on the project are available on its contact page.

== Awards and recognition ==
In 2026, Seth M. R. Jaipuria School, Vineet Khand, Gomti Nagar, Lucknow, was named among the world's top 10 schools in the Community Collaboration category of the World's Best School Prizes, organised by T4 Education.
