= Ishwar Chandra Gupta =

Indian Bengali poet and writer

- Born: 6 March 1812; Kanchrapara, 24 Parganas, Bengal Presidency, Company rule in India
- Died: 23 January 1859 (aged 46); Calcutta, Bengal Presidency, British India
- Occupations: Poet, scholar and writer

Ishwar Chandra Gupta (6 March 1812 – 23 January 1859) was a Bengali poet and writer. Gupta was born in Kanchrapara, in Bengal.

== Early life ==
Ishwar Chandra Gupta was born in a Baidya family. He was brought up in his uncle's house after the death of his mother. Gupta spent most of his childhood in Kolkata. At that time, poets were named Kobiwala and the kobiwalas were not so civilized in language. Sexual words and clashes were common. But Ishwar Chandra Gupta created a different style of poetry.

He started the newspaper Sambad Prabhakar with Jogendra Mohan Tagore on January 28, 1831, which finally became a daily on June 4, 1839. Many Bengali writers of the 19th century started their careers with that magazine. He reintroduced into Bengali poetry the medieval style with double meaning (already seen in Sandhyakaranandi and Bharatchandra):

কে বলে ঈশ্বর গুপ্ত, ব্যপ্ত চরাচর,
যাহার প্রভায় প্রভা পায় প্রভাকর।

Ke bole Ishwar Gupta, byapta charachar,
Jahar prabhaye prabha paye Prabhakar.

'Ishwar' means God, 'Gupta' means hidden and 'Prabhakar' is the sun. So a translation runs:

Who says God is hidden? He is omnipresent
From Him the Sun gets its luminescence.

Also, Ishwar (Chandra) Gupta ran the journal Prabhakar. So a second meaning of the poem, making a tongue-in-cheek reference to the author, runs:

Who says Ishwar (Gupta) is hidden? His reach touches the world
For his brilliance makes the Prabhakar luminescent.

== Literary style ==
He brought modern era of poetry in Bengali. He did not describe the life of Gods and Goddesses, but the daily life of human beings. He also wrote biographies of many Bengali poets and musicians.

Ishwarchandra Gupta often satirized the so-called modern class who blindly followed the colonial British power.

Tumi ma kalpataru
Amra shob posha goru
Shikhi ni shing bankano
Khai kebol khol-bichuli-ghash
Jano ranga amla

Tule mamla

Na bhange gamla

Ma!
Pele bhushi

Tatei kushi

Ghushi khele bachbo na!

Poetry book : Probodh Provakor, Hit Provakor, Monikrishno sompadito etc.

== Political views ==
In his early days he was a conservative, opposing the Young Bengal movement as well as disapproving of widow remarriage. His views on widow remarriage put him at odds with Ishwar Chandra Vidyasagar. He was one of the earliest advocates of a Hindu view of Indian society. Later in his life, his views began to change and he championed the cause for the remarriage of virgin widows and women's education.
