= Seth Anandram Jaipuria College =

Undergraduate degree college

- Motto in English: Knowledge is Nectar of Life
- Type: Undergraduate College
- Established: 1945; 81 years ago
- Founder: Padmabhushan Seth Mangturam Jaipuria
- Affiliations: University of Calcutta
- Principal: Dr. Madhuchhanda Lahiri
- Location: 10, Raja Nabakrishna Street, Shobhabazar, Kolkata, West Bengal, 700005, India; 22.5967213°N 88.3636702°E
- Campus: Urban
- Website: www.sajaipuriacollege.ac.in
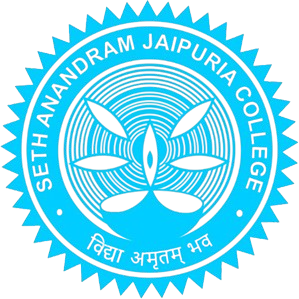

- Location in Kolkata Seth Anandram Jaipuria College (India)

Seth Anandram Jaipuria College is a public college, affiliated to the University of Calcutta. It was inaugurated by Pt. Jawaharlal Nehru in 1945 at 10, Raja Nabakrishna Street in North Kolkata. It runs three shifts: Morning, Day, and Evening. The college is serving society and the nation since its inception.

The college offers both undergraduate and post-graduate courses in a number of subjects in the three streams of arts, science, and commerce. It runs three shifts- Morning, Day, and Evening. It is accredited with an (B) grade by the National Assessment and Accreditation Council (NAAC). This college serves the fundamental right of a human being, education, at a very affordable cost.

The college offers both undergraduate and post-graduate courses in a number of subjects in the three streams of arts, science, and commerce.

== History ==
Seth Anandram Jaipuria College ( শেঠ আনন্দরাম জয়পুরিয়া কলেজ ) was founded by Sri Mangturam Jaipuria in memory of his illustrious father. It was housed in the famous Sovabazar Rajbari, a landmark in the cultural history of the city of Kolkata. The College, since its inception, has been associated with many eminent personalities who were involved in the Indian Nationalist Movement. One of them, was Pt. Jawaharlal Nehru, who inaugurated the College on 22 December, 1945.

In memory of the illustrious founder of the college, Late Seth Mangturam Jaipuria, the trust and the governing body of the college award gold medals annually to the successful students who secure the highest marks in the three disciplines of arts, science, and commerce in the university examinations.

== Notable alumni ==
- Abir Chatterjee, Actor
- Santanu Chaudhuri, director of Manufacturing Science and Engineering, Argonne National Laboratory
- Subhasish Mukhopadhyay, comedian and actor
- Abhishek Chatterjee, actor
- Sreelekha Mitra, actress
- Joydeep Karmakar, Olympian
- Abhishek Jhunjhunwala, cricketer
- Anustup Majumdar, cricketer
- Priyanka Roy, cricketer

== See also ==
- List of colleges affiliated to the University of Calcutta
- Education in India
- Education in West Bengal
