= Gopi Mohun Deb =

Indian scholar

2nd Maharaja of Sovabazar
- Preceded by: Maharaja Nabakrishna Deb
- Succeeded by: Raja Sir Radhakanta Deb

Personal details
- Born: 1767 Calcutta, Bengal Presidency, British India (now Kolkata, India)
- Died: 1847 (aged 79–80) Calcutta, Bengal Presidency, British India

Gopi Mohun Deb (1767-1847) was a member of the Shovabazar Raj family, a philanthropist, and educationist.

Deb was the son of Ram Sundar Deb and was later adopted by his uncle Raja Naba Krishna Deb.

Deb was a Persian scholar and one of the first five founder members and directors of the Hindu College. He was the founder of famous Dharma Sabha, a conservative Hindu religious body, which spoke on views and rights of Hindus.

== See also ==
- Shobhabazar Rajbari
