= Shobhabazar =

- Neighbourhood in Kolkata (Calcutta)
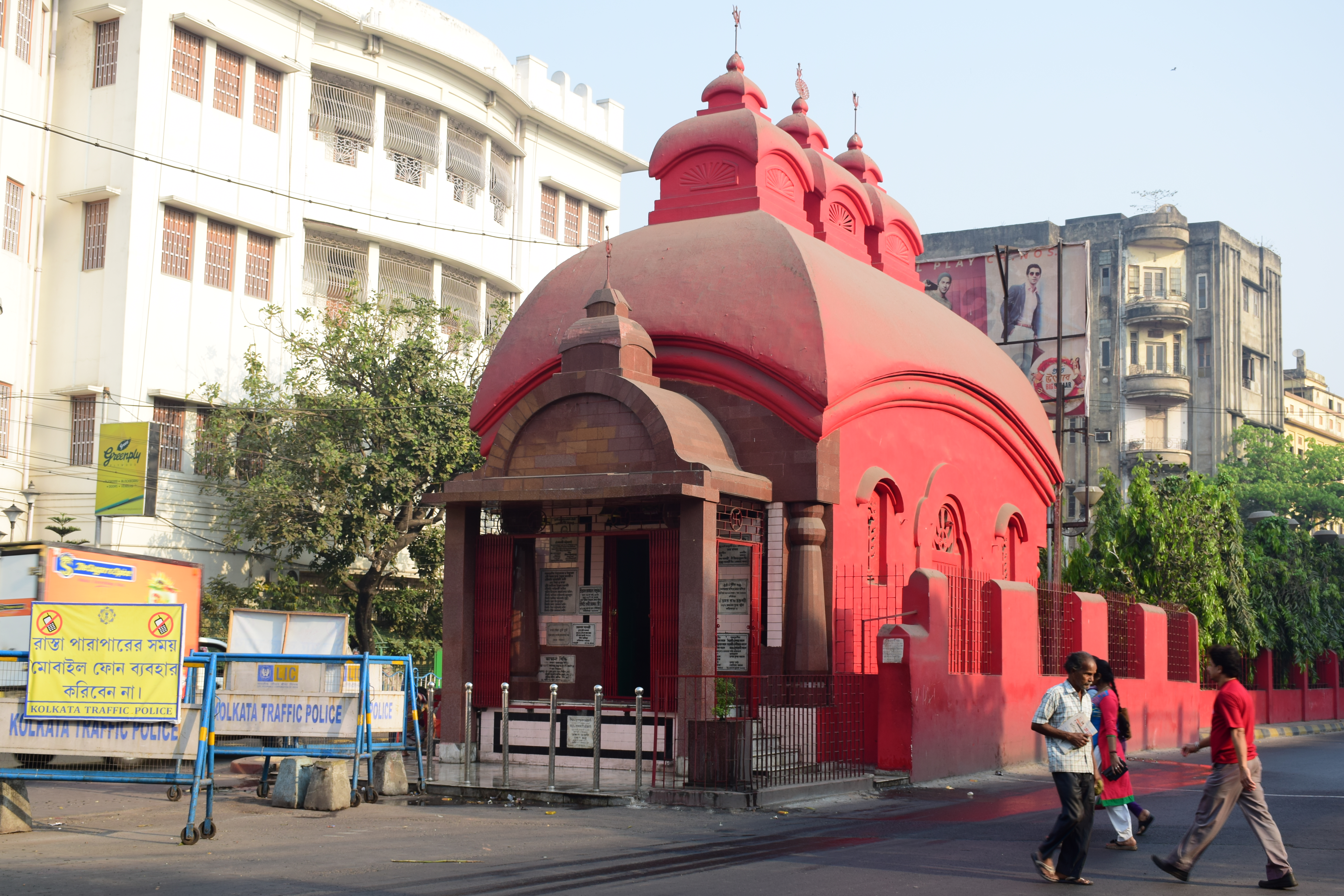
- Lal Mandir in Shobhabazar

- Location in Kolkata
- Coordinates: 22.5961°N 88.3653°E
- Country: India
- State: West Bengal
- City: Kolkata
- District: Kolkata
- Metro Station: Shobhabazar-Sutanuti
- Municipal corporation: Kolkata Municipal Corporation
- KMC wards: 8, 9, 10, 17, 18, 19, 20
- Elevation: 36 ft (11 m)

Population
  - Total: For population see linked KMC ward pages
- Time zone: UTC+5:30 (IST)
- PIN: 700005, 700006
- Area code: +91 33
- Lok Sabha constituency: Kolkata Uttar
- Vidhan Sabha constituency: Shyampukur

Shobhabazar (also spelt Sovabazar; Bengali: শোভাবাজার) is a neighbourhood of North Kolkata, in Kolkata district, in the Indian state of West Bengal.

== History ==
Sheths and Basaks, well-to-do traders at Saptagram, were among the first to settle in Sutanuti and are said to have cleared much of the jungles in the area. Neighbouring Shyambazar was named after the family deity of the Basaks, Shyam Roy (or Gobinda), the attendant of goddess Kali by Shobharam Basak, one of the richest native inhabitants of 18th-century Kolkata.

When Ramcharan Deb was murdered by Maratha marauders in the jungles of Midnapore, his widow came back to their house at Gobindapur with her three sons and five daughters. The house was washed away by the Hooghly River and they moved to Arpooly, and from there to Shobhabazar. Ramcharan's youngest son Maharaja Nabakrishna Deb rose to fame and power.

The glorious days of Shobhabazar starts with the decision of the British to build, after their decisive win in Battle of Plassey, the new Fort William in the heart of Gobindapur. The inhabitants of the village were compensated and provided with land in Taltala, Kumortuli and Shobhabazar.

Maharaja Nabakrishna Deb built his Rajbari (palace) at Shobhabazar. Some say that he acquired it from Shobharam Basak and made major extensions, matching his taste for pomp and grandeur. At least money was not in short supply. After the death of Siraj ud-Daulah, Nabakrishna Deb along with Mir Jafar, Amir Beg and Ramchand Roy earned eight crore rupees worth of treasures from the secret treasury.

Maharaja Nabakrishna Deb is said to have constructed the road from Upper Chitpur Road (now Rabindra Sarani) to Upper Circular Road (now Acharya Prafulla Chandra Road) and named with his own name. However, while half of the street was merged with Grey Street (now Aurobindo Sarani), another half became Shobhabazar Street. Another street north of it was named Raja Nabakrishna Street.

Amongst those in the Deb family, who had streets named after them are: Raja Gopi Mohun Deb, Raja Sir Radhakanta Deb, Raja Rajendra Narain, Raja Mahendra Narain, Raja Debendra Narain (adopted side), Raja Raj Krishna, Taja Bahadur Kali Krishna, Maharaja Kamal Krishna, Maharaja Bahadur Sir Narendra Krishna and Rajah Bahadur Harendra Krishna (own side).

== Geography ==
Shobhabazar is spread over Ward No. 8, Ward No. 9, Ward No. 10, Ward No. 18 and Ward No. 19 of Kolkata Municipal Corporation and is bounded by Baghbazar on the north, Shyambazar and Hatibagan on the east, Beniatola and Nimtala on the south and the Hooghly River on the west.

== Culture ==
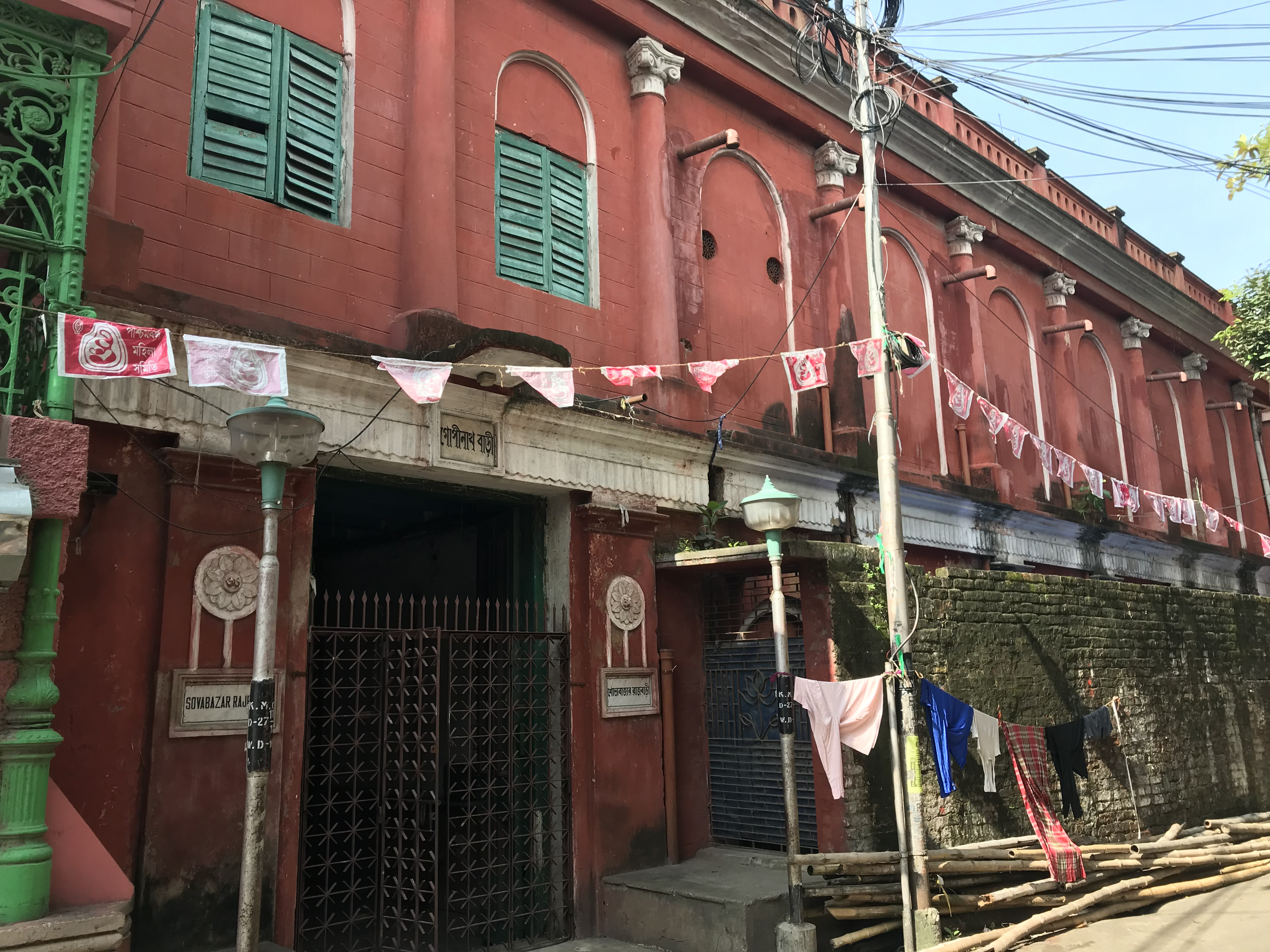
Outside View of Shobhabazar Rajbari

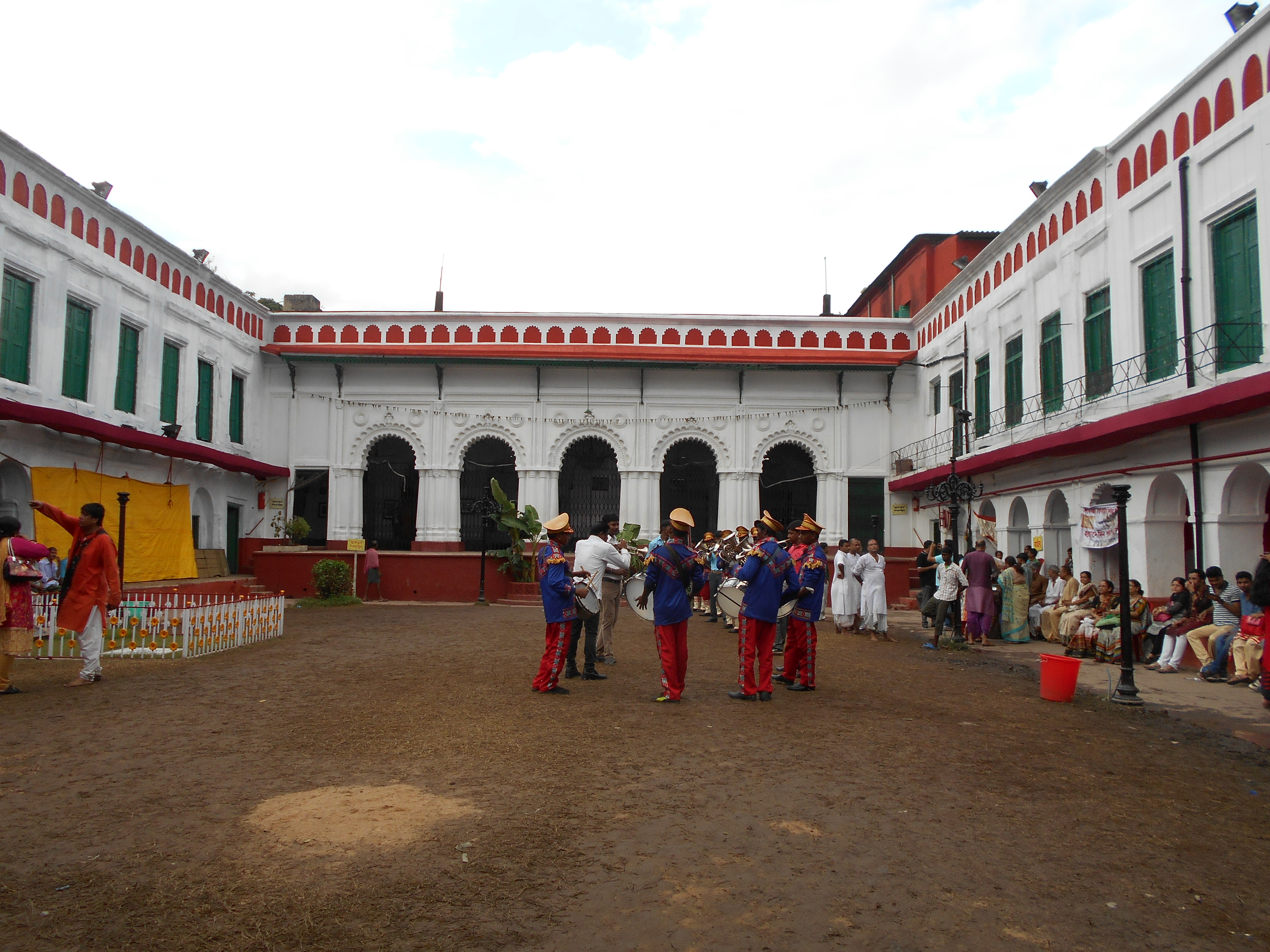
Thakurdalan of Shobhabazar Rajbari

Maharaja Naba Krishna Deb started the Durga Puja in Shobhabazar Rajbari in 1757. He set a pattern for the puja which became a fashion and a status symbol among the upcoming merchant class of Kolkata. The number of Englishmen attending the family Durga Puja became an index of prestige. Religious scruples fell by the wayside. The nautch girls were mostly from Muslim gharanas. The Englishmen attending the dance parties dined on beef and ham from Wilson's Hotel and drank to their heart's contentment.

The Shobhabazar Durga Puja is split into two parts, near each other, but both the Pujas continue with their characteristic distinctions. Karttikeya is dressed in breeches worn by Englishmen. In most Bengali pujas Ganesha dons the traditional dhuti-chadar, but at Shobhabazar he is an idol worshipped by the Marwari ancestors of Jagat Seth; and Durga wears jewellery designed after the Mughals or Nawabs of Oudh.

It was in the Shobhabazar Rajbari dalan (courtyard) that Swami Vivekananda was accorded a civic reception after his return from the Parliament of the World's Religions at Chicago.

Shobhabazar Rajbari is identified as a heritage building by Kolkata Municipal Corporation.

== Transport ==
=== Road ===
Buses ply along Rabindra Sarani, B.K. Paul Avenue-Shobhabazar Street and Jatindra Mohan Avenue in Shobhabazar.

Buses which enters into Sovabazar are:

- 43 (Dakshineswar - Esplanade)
- S-139 Mini (Shyambazar - Babughat)

Several State buses ply on Jatindra Mohan Avenue are:

WBTC

- AC 54 (Rathtala - Howrah Stn)
- S 9A (Dunlop - Ballygunge Stn)
- E-32 (Nilgunge Depot - Howrah Stn)
- AC 54B (Barrackpore - Howrah Stn)
- AC 20 (Barrackpore - Santragachi)
- S 10 (Airport - Nabanna)
- S 17A (Dakshineswar - Kudghat)
- AC 40 (Airport - Howrah Maidan)
- S 11 (Barrackpore - Esplanade)
- S 57 (Ariadaha - Nabanna)
- S 32 (Barrackpore - Howrah Stn)

=== Railway ===
Shobhabazar Ahiritola railway station on Kolkata Circular Railway line serves the locality. Kolkata Station, one of the major railway hub stations of the city, is also located nearby.
