= Nabakrishna Deb =

King of Sovabazar from 1766 to 1797

Maharaja Nabakrishna Deb Bahadur
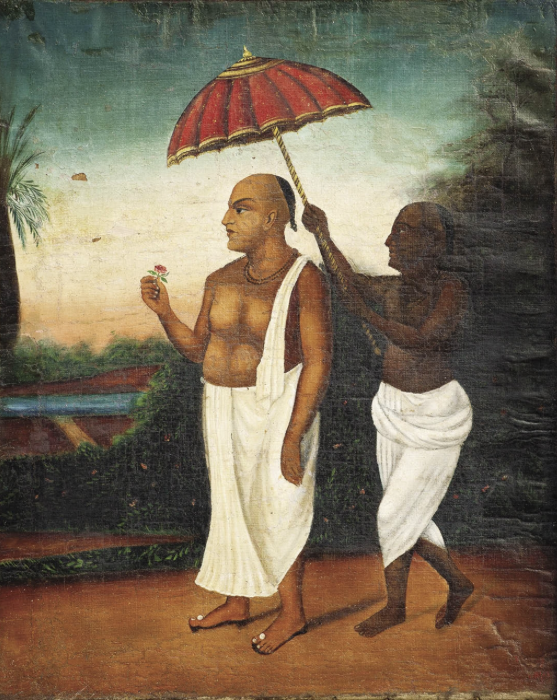
- Maharaja Nabakrishna Deb and his servant on the banks of the Hooghly river

1st Maharaja of Sovabazar and Sutanuti
- In office 1766–1797
- Succeeded by: Raja Gopi Mohun Deb

Personal details
- Born: 10 October 1733
- Died: 22 November 1797 (aged 64) Calcutta, British Raj

Maharaja Nabakrishna Deb Bahadur (also known as Raja Nabakrishna Deb, archaic spelling Nubkissen; 10 October 1733 – 22 November 1797), was the King of Sovabazar and Sutanuti from 1766 until his death in 1797, founder of the Sovabazar Raj family and close confidant and friend of Robert Clive.

Deb was instrumental in a plot against Siraj-ud-Daulah.

== Early life ==
Nabakrishna was born into middle-class family to Ram Charan Deb, who was a businessman and a Dewan under the Nawab Of Cuttack. He was a teacher of Persian to Warren Hastings.

== Administration ==
In 1757, Deb began construction of Shobhabazar Rajbari. It was a large house with a public courtyard, and was designed to flaunt his wealth and status. There he hosted an annual Durga Puja at Sovabazar Palace. Clive attended after his victory at the Battle of Plassey. Deb performed intellgent service for the Company during the military campaign against the Nawab of Bengal, supplied aid to the Company's army, and derived immense material benefits from the consequent dissolution of power in Murshidabad.

== Gallery ==
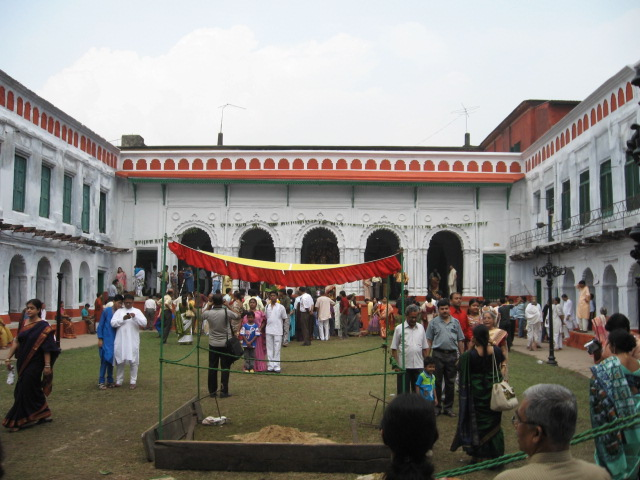
Thakurdalan at Shobhabazar Rajbari

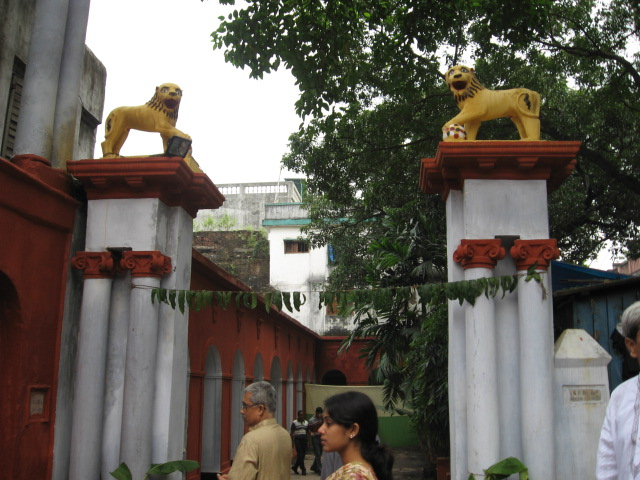
Singh Dwar (Lion gate) at Shobhabazar Rajbari

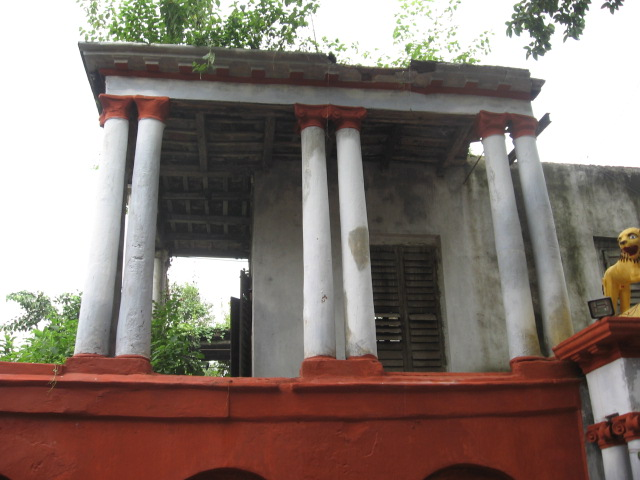
Natmandir at Shobhabazar Rajbari

Sovabazar Palace plaque
