= Orange Line (Kolkata Metro) =

Transit line in Kolkata, India

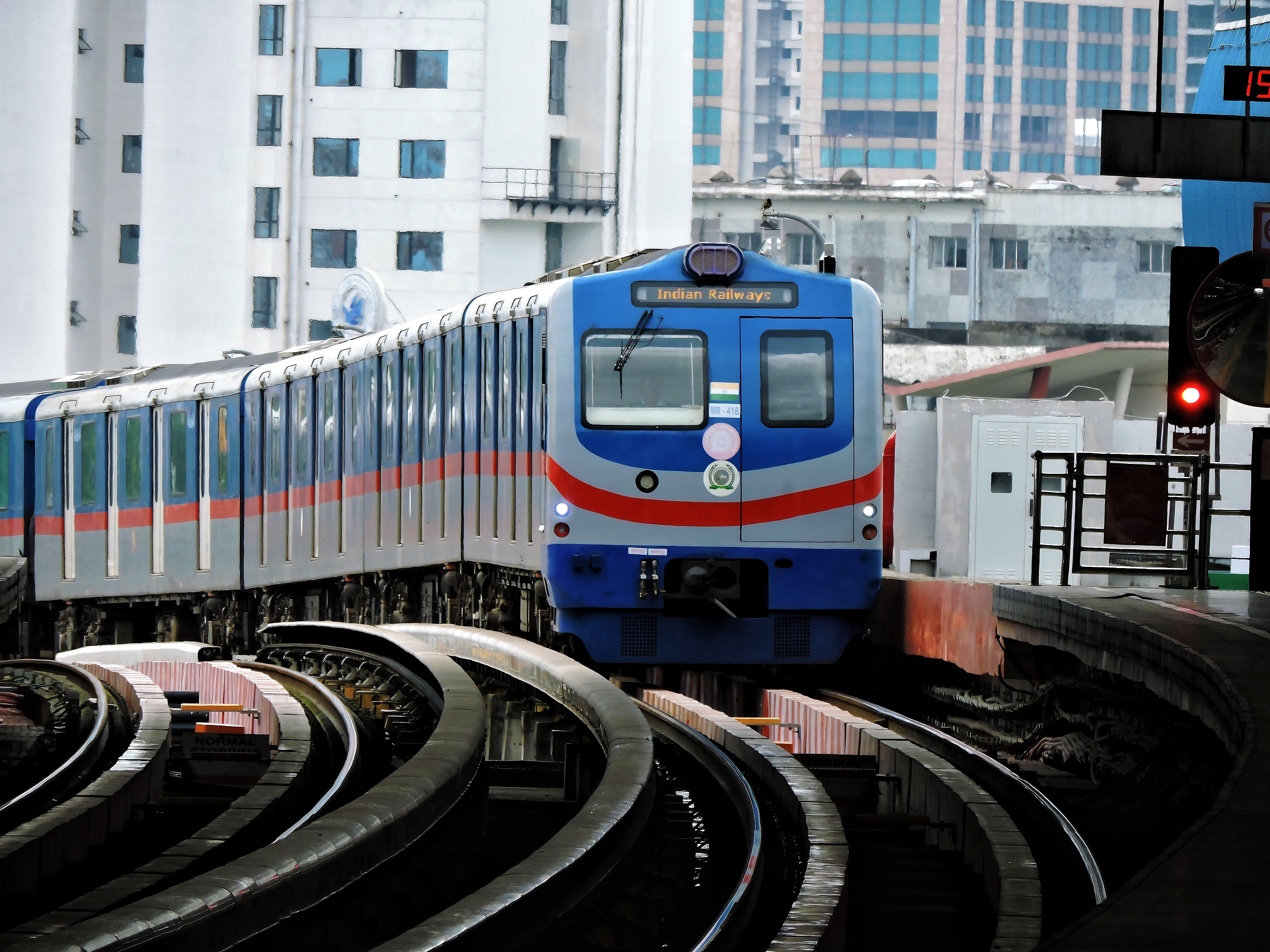

Overview
- Other names: New Town Metro; Airport Metro; Bypass Metro
- Status: Partially Operational
- Owner: Indian Railways
- Locale: Kolkata metropolitan region
- Termini: Kavi Subhash (south); Jai Hind (north)
- Connecting lines: Future: Blue Line; Green Line; Yellow Line
- Stations: Operational: 9; Under construction: 15
- Website: Indian Railways

Service
- Type: Rapid transit
- System: Kolkata Metro
- Operator: Metro Railway, Kolkata
- Depots: New Garia Depot; New Town Depot (under construction); Airport yard
- Rolling stock: ICF MEDHA
- Ridership: 5.92 lakh (annual, 2024-2025)

History
- Opened: 6 March 2024; 2 years ago
- Last extension: 22 August 2025; 14 months ago

Technical
- Line length: 29.87 km (18.56 mi); Operational: 9.9 km (6.2 mi); Under construction: 19.97 km (12.41 mi)
- Num of tracks: 2
- Character: Underground, at-grade and elevated
- Track gauge: 5 ft 6 in (1,676 mm) broad gauge
- Electrification: 750 V DC using third rail
- Operating speed: 80 km/h (designed) 42 km/h (operating)
- Signalling: CBTC ATP signalling
Route map
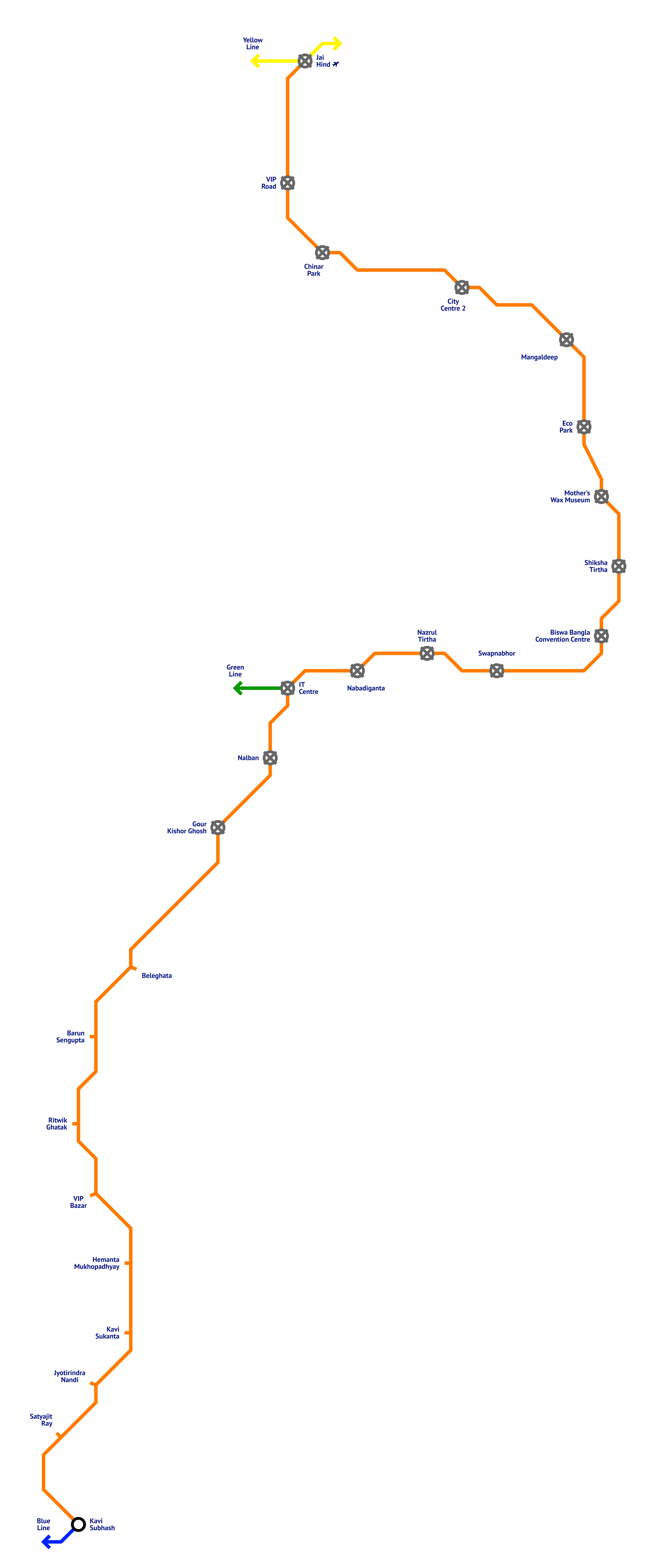

Orange Line is a rapid transit metro line of the Kolkata Metro in Kolkata, West Bengal, India. It will connect New Garia with Netaji Subhas Chandra Bose International Airport via two major satellite towns of Kolkata metropolitan region, Salt Lake and New Town. It currently operates between Kavi Subhash and Beleghata. This line will be one of the most important stretches of Kolkata Metro because it will connect the southern and the eastern parts of the city with Kolkata Airport. The total distance of this route will be 29.87 km (18.56 mi). It has an interchange with the Blue Line at Kavi Subhash and will eventually connect with the Green Line near the IT Centre and Yellow Line at Jai Hind. This line had 5.92 lakh passengers in the 2024–2025 fiscal year.

== History ==
ICF Medha Rake entering Hemanta Mukhopadhyay Metro Station, seen during Hemanta Mukhopadhyay metro station to Kavi Subhash metro journey

This project was sanctioned in the budget of 2010–11 by Mamata Banerjee with a project deadline of six years. The execution of this project has been entrusted to the Rail Vikas Nigam Limited (RVNL) at a cost of ₹3,951.98 crore (US$846.75 million). It will help to reduce travel time between the southern fringes of Kolkata to Netaji Subhas Chandra Bose International Airport and will have 23 elevated stations, one underground station and one at-grade. The terminal airport station is the underground one.

Work for construction of the terminal station at New Garia for the 29.87 km (18.56 mi) Kavi Subhash-Biman Bandar (via Rajarhat) metro project finally resumed on 14 February 2017 RVNL demarcating the plot they require for the purpose.

The work has been delayed for years due to multiple issues. At first, the Airports Authority of India (AAI) objected the station above the ground, stating that this could be a threat for air traffic. Many underground utilities, power sub-station and water treatment plant had to be shifted. Encroachments and land acquisition problems held up the project for multiple times.

The 5 km (3.1 mi) stretch from New Garia to Ruby Hospital was expected to start from 2018. As of 2023, the station and associated metro viaduct connections were fully completed with trial runs being conducted over this and other phase 1 stations. RVNL planned to launch the metro over this truncated route before that year's Durga Puja, but this was postponed due to signalling issues.

The Kavi Subhash–Hemanta Mukhopadhyay section of Orange Line was inaugurated on 6 March 2024 by the Prime Minister Narendra Modi, along with the truncated sections of Taratala–Majerhat under Purple Line and Esplanade–Howrah Maidan under Green Line. A week later after inauguration and a day after commercial run started on Kavi Subhash-Hemanta Mukhopadhyay section, RVNL announced the completion of a 76 m (249 ft) viaduct gap after construction of a single-span open-web girder steel bridge over Tagore Park culvert. This completed the viaduct up to Beliaghata metro station. RVNL has faced enormous challenges while working, in one such incident it incurred enormous loss of over 5 crore rupees due to lack of clearance of traffic from Kolkata Police and work being stalled for over 60 days. The Hemanta Mukhopadhyay–Beleghata Orange Line extension was opened on 22 August 2025, along with the truncated sections of Noapara–Jai Hind under Yellow Line and Esplanade–Sealdah under Green Line.

The service starts from 8 am and ends at 8:05 pm, with 60 pairs of services from Monday to Friday. All the trains run at a frequency of 25 minutes.There are no services on Saturdays and Sundays.

== Timeline ==
The following dates represent the dates the section opened to the public, not the private inauguration.

History
Extension date	Terminals		Length
6 March 2024	Kavi Subhash	Hemanta Mukhopadhyay	5.4 kilometers (3.4 mi)
22 August 2025	Hemanta Mukhopadhyay	Beleghata	4.5 kilometers (2.8 mi)
Total	Kavi Subhash	Beleghata	9.9 kilometers (6.2 mi)

=== Trial Runs:- ===
24 September 2022 -> Maiden Trial Runs with a NON-AC NGEF Metro Rake [Rake No. 8N 16/18] started from Kavi Subhash (New Garia) Metro Station to Hemanta Mukhopadhya (Ruby More) Metro Station.

27 April 2024 -> Trial Runs started with an AC Medha Metro Rake [Rake No. MR-415] from Hemanta Mukhopadhya (Ruby More) Metro Station to Beleghata Metro Station.

10 October 2026 -> Trial Runs started with an AC Medha Metro Rake [Rake No. MR-415] from Beleghata Metro Station to IT Centre (Saltlake Sector - V) Metro Station.

=== Inaugural Runs:- ===
06 March 2024 -> The Phase - I stretch, i.e., from Kavi Subhash (New Garia) Metro Station to Hemanta Mukhopadhya (Ruby More) Metro Station was inaugurated.

22 August 2025 -> The Phase - II stretch, i.e., from Hemanta Mukhopadhya (Ruby More) Metro Station to Beleghata Metro Station was inaugurated.

== Stations ==
The stations are named after eminent Bengali personalities. and will have 22 elevated stations, one underground station and one at-grade. The terminal Airport station will be the underground one. This station will also have a stabling yard and it will be the largest underground facility of India and city's first. It will be 550 m (1,800 ft) long and 41.6 m (136 ft) wide and will facilitate stabling and reversal of rakes, but it will not be a carshed. One will be able to interchange to Yellow Line at Dum Dum Airport, Green Line at VIP Road (Teghoria) and near IT Centre and Blue Line at Kavi Subhash. At Kavi Subhash, rail interchange is also available (Sealdah South Section).

On 4 January 2021 the state government decided to rename nine metro stations in New Town area to their more prevailing names, rather than using the old ones which were given during the planning phase. The state transport department informed Housing Infrastructure Development Corporation (HIDCO) of the new names of the proposed nine metro stations between Nazrul Tirtha at the entry of New Town from Salt Lake Sector V until Chinar Park, the last station on the line before it turns right on VIP road towards Kolkata Airport.

Orange Line
#	Station name		Station Code	Distance [KM]	Opening	Connections	Layout	Platform type
#	English	Bengali	Station Code	Distance [KM]	Opening	Connections	Layout	Platform type
1	Jai Hind (Airport)	জয় হিন্দ	KJHD	1.87	Under construction	Yellow Line; NSCBI Airport	Underground	Side & island
2	VIP Road	ভি আই পি রোড	KVIR	1.66	Under construction	Green Line Teghoria (proposed)	Elevated	Side
3	Chinar Park	চিনার পার্ক	KCNP	0.91	Under construction		Elevated	Side
4	City Centre-2	সিটি সেন্টার-২	KCCT	0.76	Under construction		Elevated	Side
5	Mangaldeep	মঙ্গলদীপ	KMDP	1.31	Under construction		Elevated	Side
6	Eco Park	ইকো পার্ক	KECP	1.02	Under construction		Elevated	Side
7	Mother's Wax Museum (New Town Action Area 2)	মাদার্স ওয়াক্স মিউজিয়াম	KMWM	1.38	Under construction		Elevated	Side
8	Shiksha Tirtha (Jatragachhi)	শিক্ষা তীর্থ	KSST	0.92	Under construction		Elevated	Side
9	Biswa Bangla Convention Centre	বিশ্ব বাংলা কনভেনশন সেন্টার	KBCC	1.3	Under construction		Elevated	Side
10	Swapnabhor (New Town Action Area 1B)	স্বপ্ন ভোর	KSPB	0.99	Under construction		Elevated	Side
11	Nazrul Tirtha (New Town Action Area 1A)	নজরুল তীর্থ	KNLT	1.4	Under construction		Elevated	Side
12	Nabadiganta (Technopolis)	নবদিগন্ত	KNBG	1.13	Under construction		Elevated	Side
13	IT Centre (Salt Lake Sector-V)	আই টি সেন্টার	KITC	1.29	21st November	Green Line Salt Lake Sector-V	Elevated	Side
14	Nalban (Nicco Park)	নলবন	KNLN	1.5	21st November		Elevated	Side
15	Gour Kishore Ghosh (Chingrighata)	গৌর কিশোর ঘোষ	KGKG	1.67	21st November		Elevated	Side
16	Beleghata	বেলেঘাটা	KBGA	0.94	22 August 2025		Elevated	Side
17	Barun Sengupta (Science City)	বরুণ সেনগুপ্ত	KBST	1.25	22 August 2025		Elevated	Side
18	Ritwik Ghatak (Uttar Panchanna Gram)	ঋত্বিক ঘটক	KRWG	0.92	22 August 2025		Elevated	Side
19	VIP Bazar	ভি আই পি বাজার	KVIB	1.28	22 August 2025		Elevated	Side
20	Hemanta Mukhopadhyay (Ruby Crossing/Passport Office)	হেমন্ত মুখোপাধ্যায়	KHMD	1.05	6 March 2024		Elevated	Side
21	Kavi Sukanta (Kalikapur)	কবি সুকান্ত	KKSK	1.07	6 March 2024		Elevated	Side
22	Jyotirindra Nandi (Mukundapur)	জ্যোতিরিন্দ্র নন্দী	KJNN	1.39	6 March 2024		Elevated	Side
23	Satyajit Ray (Panchasayar)	সত্যজিৎ রায়	KSJR	1.89	6 March 2024		Elevated	Side
24	Kavi Subhash (New Garia)	কবি সুভাষ	KKSO [Orange] / KKVS [Blue]	0	6 March 2024	Blue Line (under construction); New Garia	At grade	Side & island

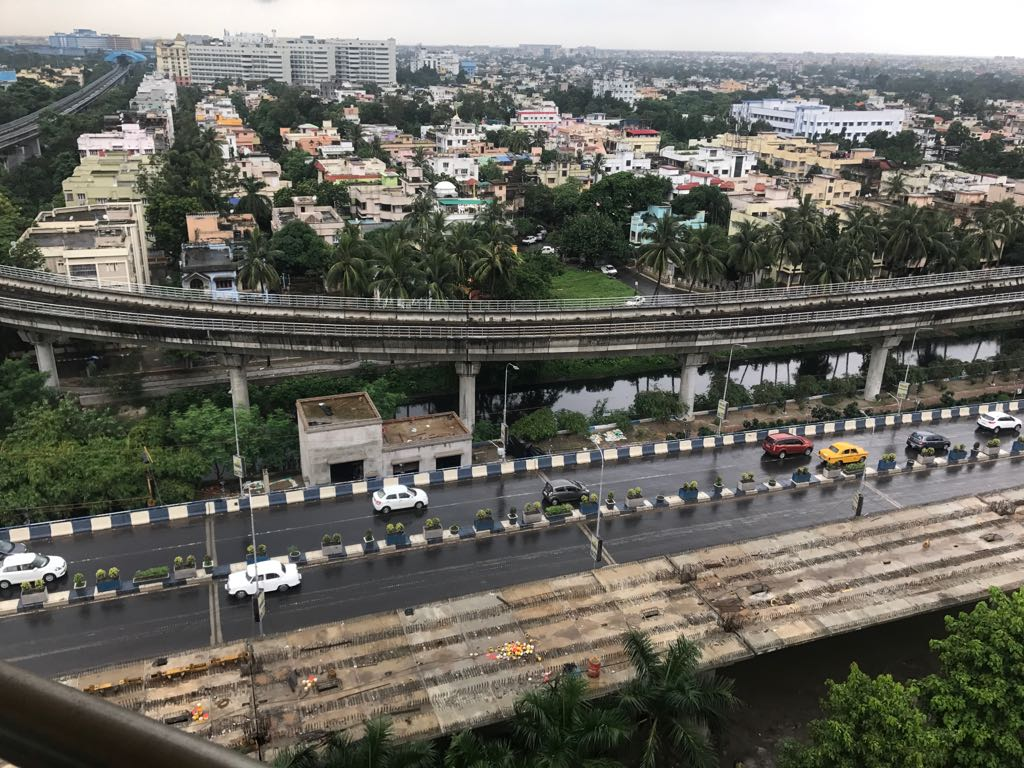
Green and Orange Lines under construction at Salt Lake Sector-V, November 2017

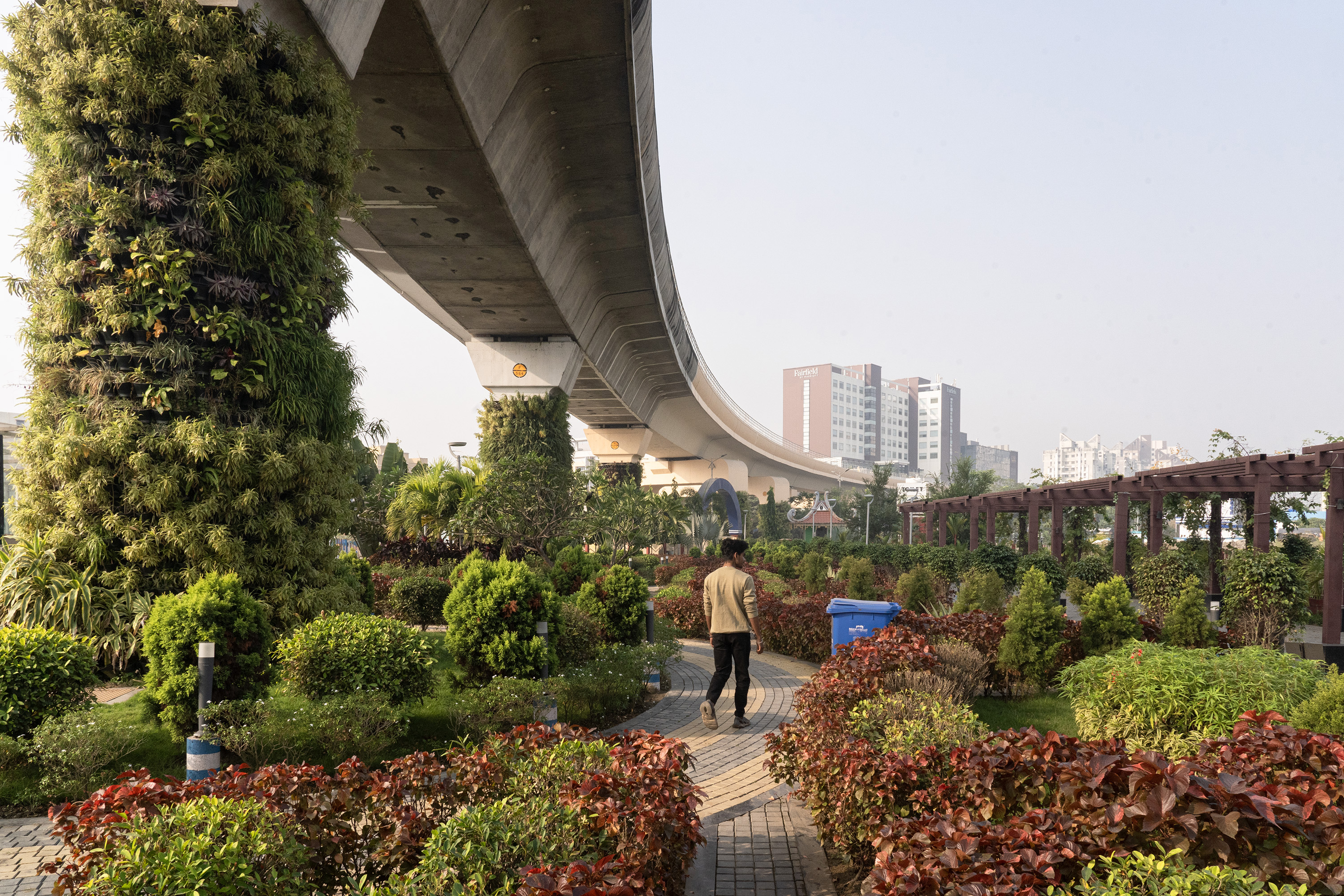
An urban garden developed by converting the unused space under metro rail using the vertical garden technique

== See also ==
- Kolkata Metro
- List of Kolkata Metro stations
- Kolkata Metro rolling stock
- Lists of rapid transit systems
- Trams in Kolkata
- Kolkata Light Rail Transit
- Kolkata Monorail
- Kolkata Suburban Railway
