= Salt Lake Sector-V and IT Centre metro stations =

Metro stations in Bidhannagar, WB, India

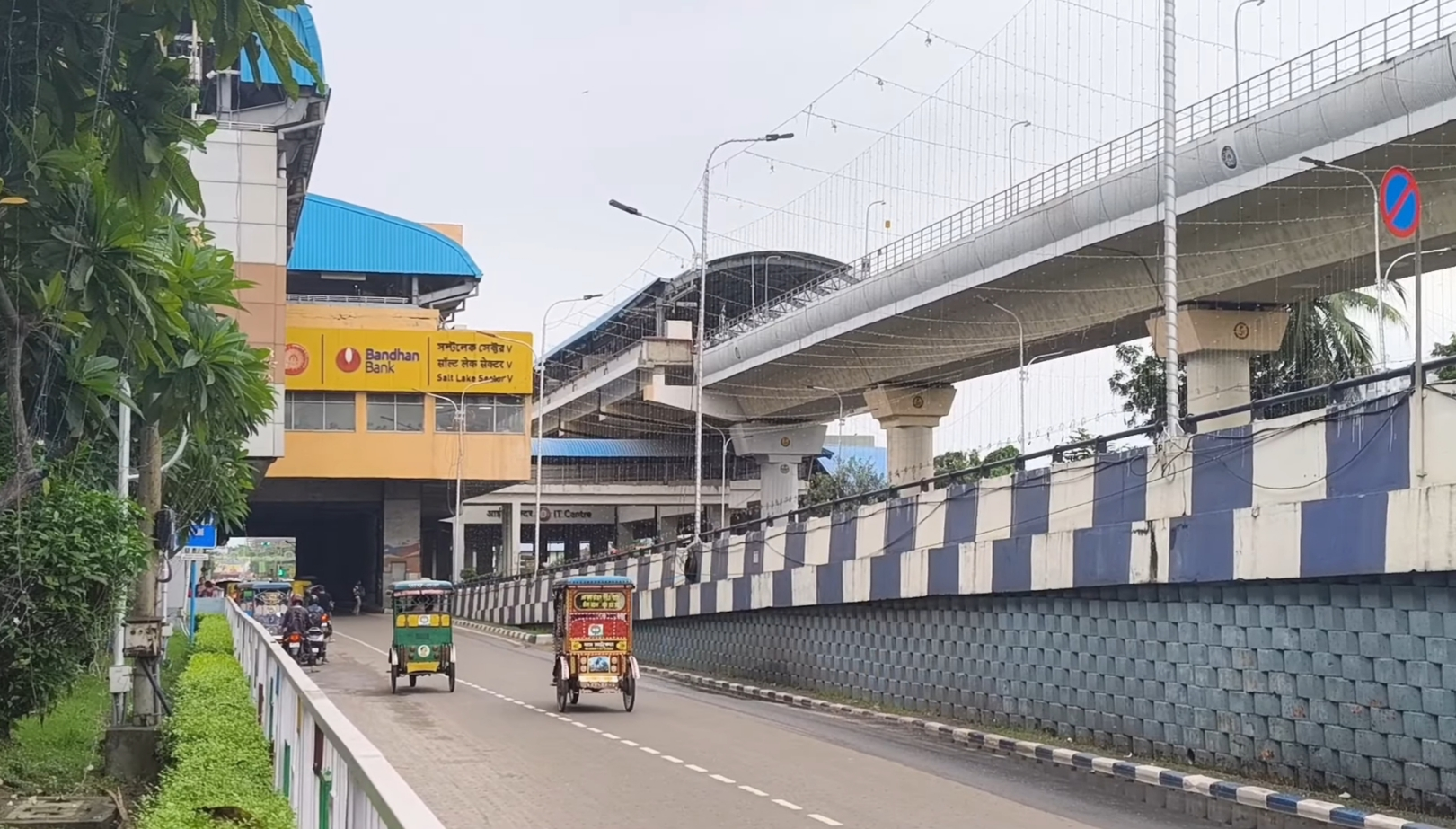
Salt Lake Sector V and IT Centre metro stations

Salt Lake Sector V (also known as Bandhan Bank, Salt Lake Sector V for sponsorship reasons) and IT Centre are the Kolkata Metro stations serving Salt Lake Sector-V. The Salt Lake Sector-V station of Green Line and the IT Centre station of the upcoming Orange Line are located beside each other, and connected by means of an over-bridge forming an elevated interchange between the Green and Orange Lines.

Salt Lake Sector-V is the terminal metro station on the Green Line. It was completed and inaugurated in February 2020. IT Centre on the Orange Line is still under construction as of November 2024.

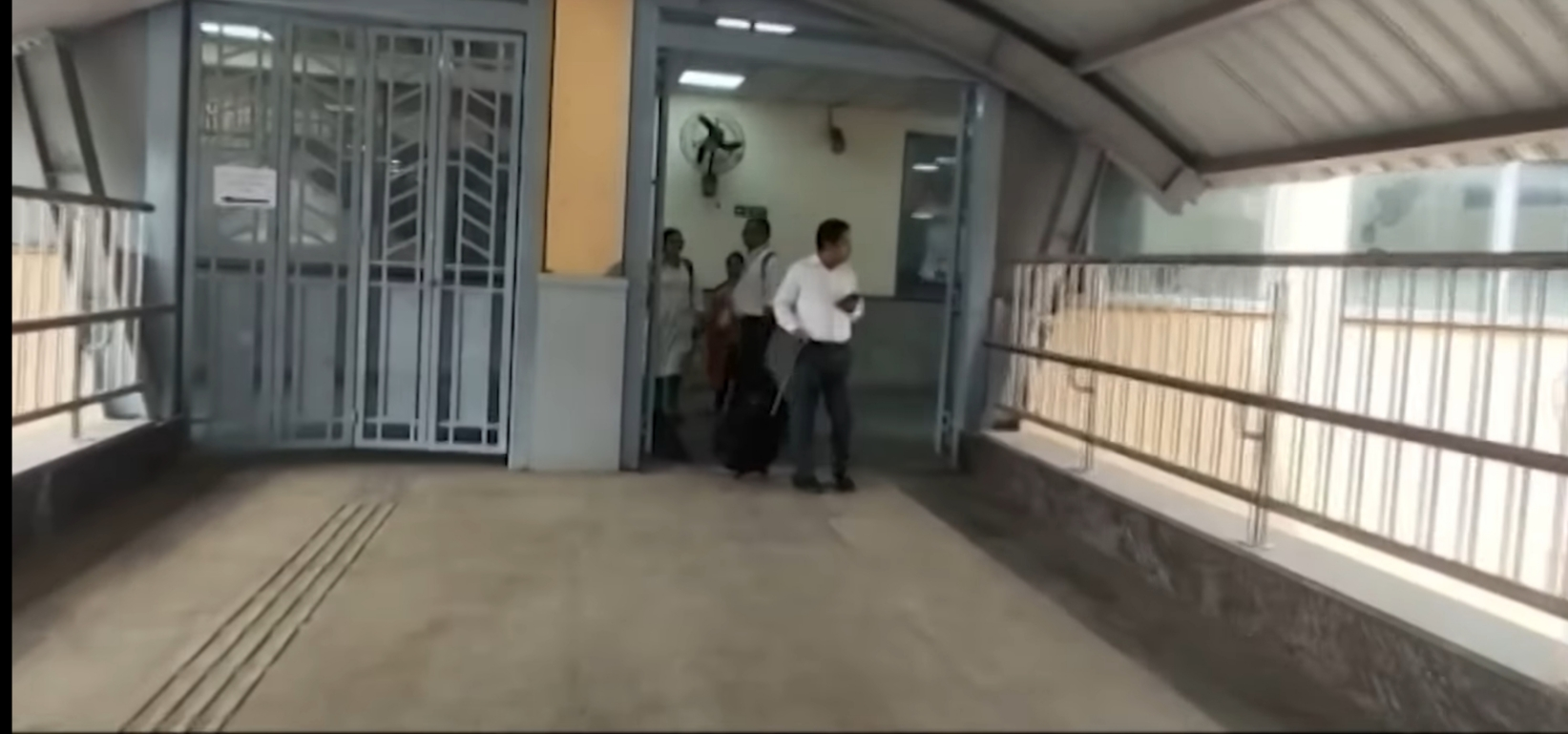
Station Interchange

The metro stations are located diagonally opposite Wipro Infotech Ltd, Salt Lake and right opposite Salt Lake RTO office. Prominent buildings in proximity to Sector- V Metro Station is TCS Gitobitan, RS Software, PS Srijan Techpark, Merlin Infinite, Merlin Matrix, Rang De Basanti Dhaba, Bandhan Bank, RS Software. Prominent educational institutes near Sector-V metro station are IIHM, EIILM, IEM UEM, Red Apple Learning, Techno India University.

== Salt Lake Sector V ==
Salt Lake Sector V
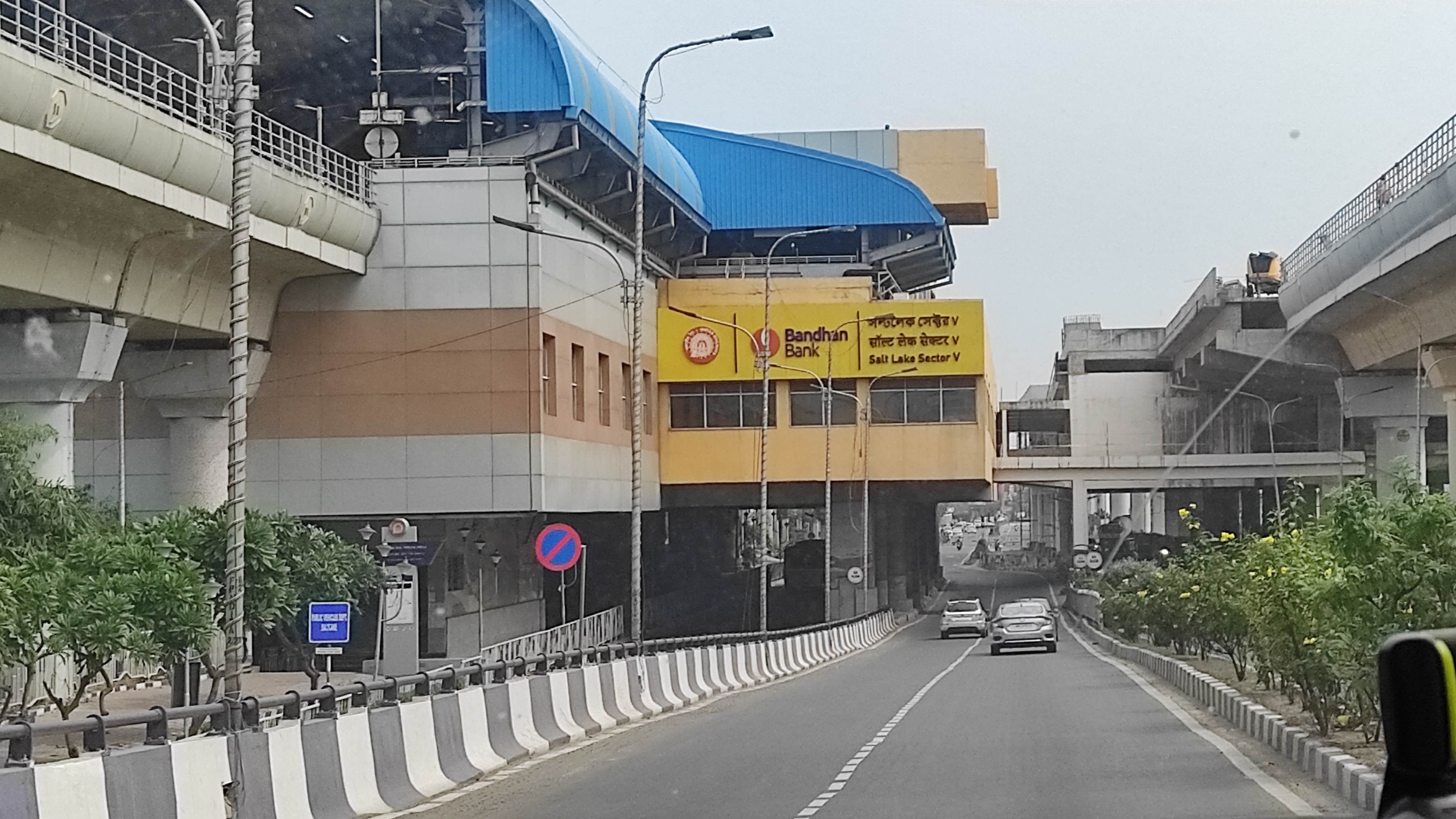
- Salt Lake Sector V metro station of Green Line on left.

General information
- Location: CM Block, Sector–V; Bidhannagar, West Bengal 700091; India
- Coordinates: 22.58131°N 88.42982°E
- System: Kolkata Metro
- Owner: Indian Railways
- Operator: Metro Railway, Kolkata
- Line: Green Line
- Platforms: 2 (2 side platforms)

Construction
- Structure type: Elevated
- Accessible: Yes

Other information
- Station code: SVSA

History
- Opened: 13 February 2020; 6 years ago

Services
Preceding station	Kolkata Metro	Following station
Karunamoyee towards Howrah Maidan	Green Line	Terminus
Route map
Location

=== Station layout ===
L2	Side platform, Doors will open on the left
L2	Platform 1	Alight only →
L2	Platform 2	← Train towards Howrah Maidan (Karunamoyee)
L2	Side platform, Doors will open on the left
L1	Concourse	Fare control, station agent, Metro QR ticket vending machines, crossover, Interchange passage to Orange Line
G	Street level	Exit/Entrance

=== Entry/exits ===
- A – Wipro
- B – CL Block

== IT Centre ==
IT Centre
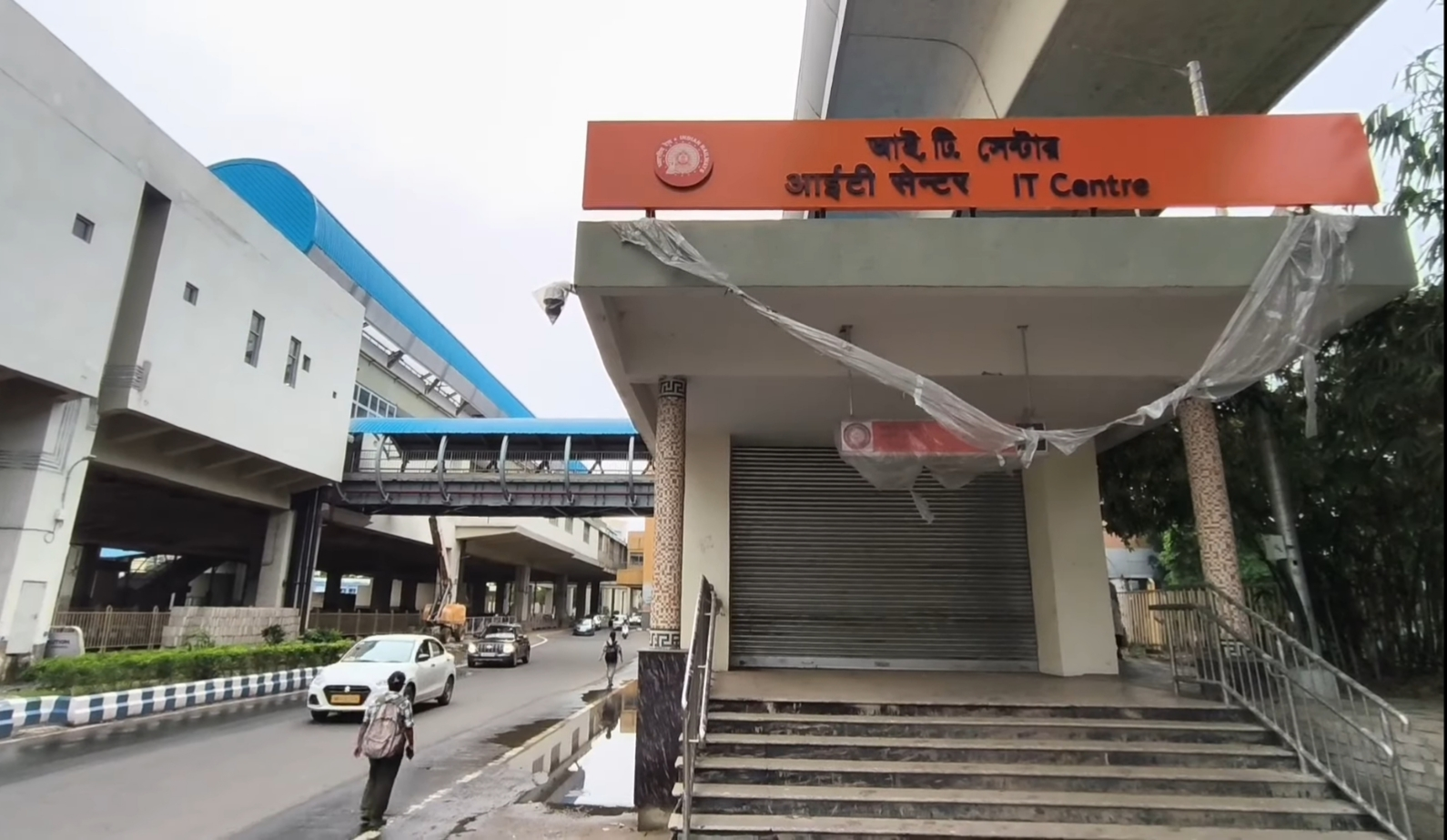

General information
- Location: CM Block, Sector–V; Bidhannagar, West Bengal 700091; India
- Coordinates: 22.58131°N 88.42982°E
- System: Kolkata Metro
- Owner: Indian Railways
- Operator: Metro Railway, Kolkata
- Line: Orange Line
- Platforms: 2 (2 side platforms)

Construction
- Structure type: Elevated
- Accessible: Yes

Other information
- Station code: KITC

History
- Opening: 2026 (expected)

Services
Preceding station	Kolkata Metro	Following station
Nalban towards Kavi Subhash	Orange Line (Future)	Nabadiganta towards Jai Hind
Route map
Location

=== Station layout ===
L2	Side platform, Doors will open on the left
L2	Platform 1	Train towards Jai Hind (Nabadiganta) →
L2	Platform 2	← Train towards Kavi Subhash (Nalban)
L2	Side platform, Doors will open on the left
L1	Concourse	Fare control, station agent, Metro QR ticket vending machines, crossover, Interchange passage to Green Line
G	Street level	Exit/Entrance

== See also ==
- List of Kolkata Metro stations
