= Nalban metro station =

Metro station in Kolkata, India

Nalban
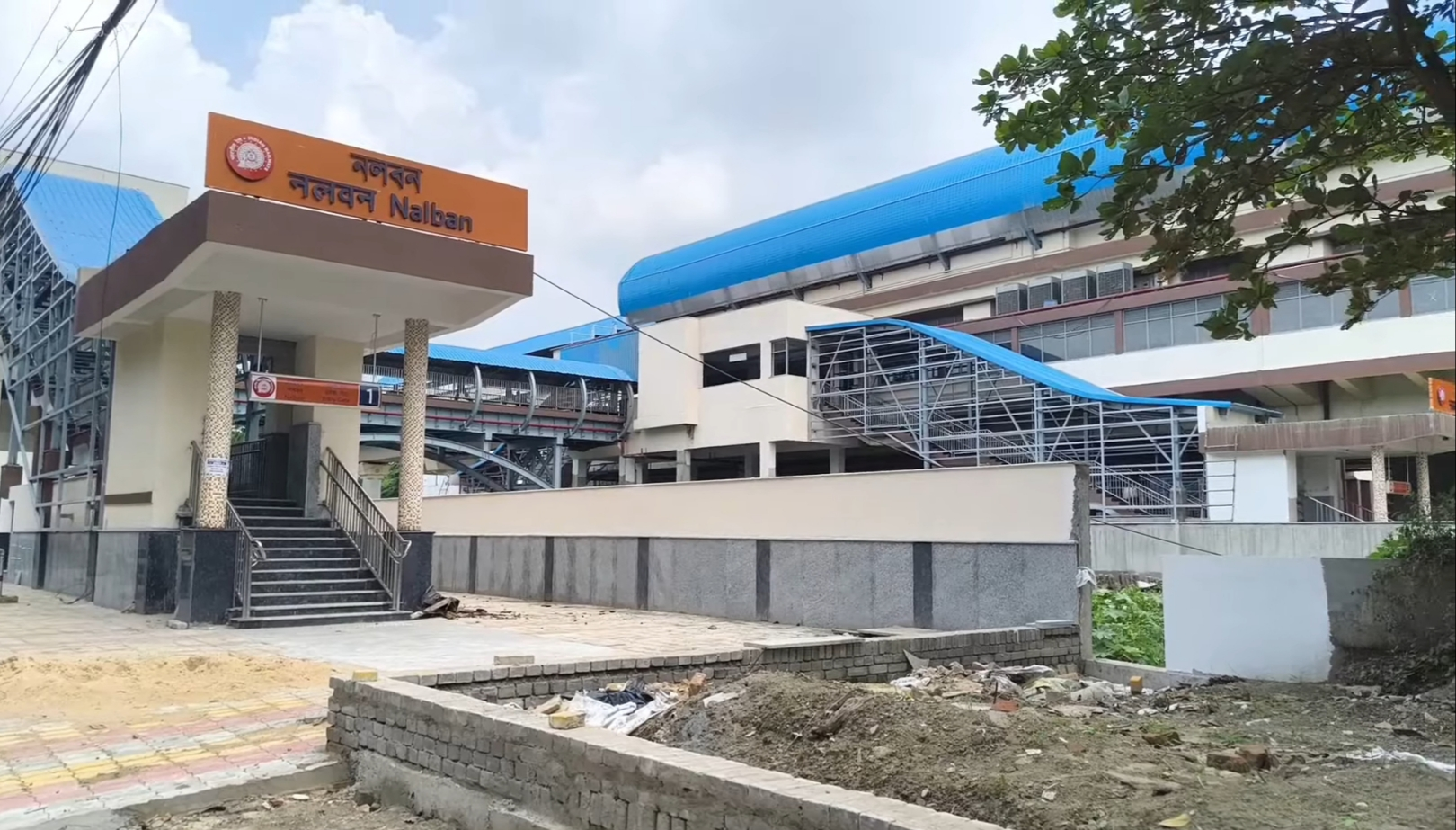

General information
- Location: HM Block, Sector IV, Bidhannagar; North 24 Parganas, West Bengal 700106; India
- Coordinates: 22.573221°N 88.421152°E
- System: Kolkata Metro
- Operator: Metro Railway, Kolkata
- Line: Orange Line
- Platforms: 2 (2 side platforms)

Construction
- Structure type: Elevated

History
- Opening: 2026 (expected)
- Former names: Nicco Park

Services
Preceding station	Kolkata Metro	Following station
Gour Kishore Ghosh towards Kavi Subhash	Orange Line (Future)	IT Centre towards Beleghata
Route map
Location

Nalban (Also known as Nicco Park) is a metro station of Orange Line of the Kolkata Metro. It is situated at just beside of Nicco Park. It will serve the area of Nalban, Salt Lake Sector IV and surrounding areas in Bidhannagar, Kolkata. The station is named after its adjacent locality, Nalban.

== Location ==
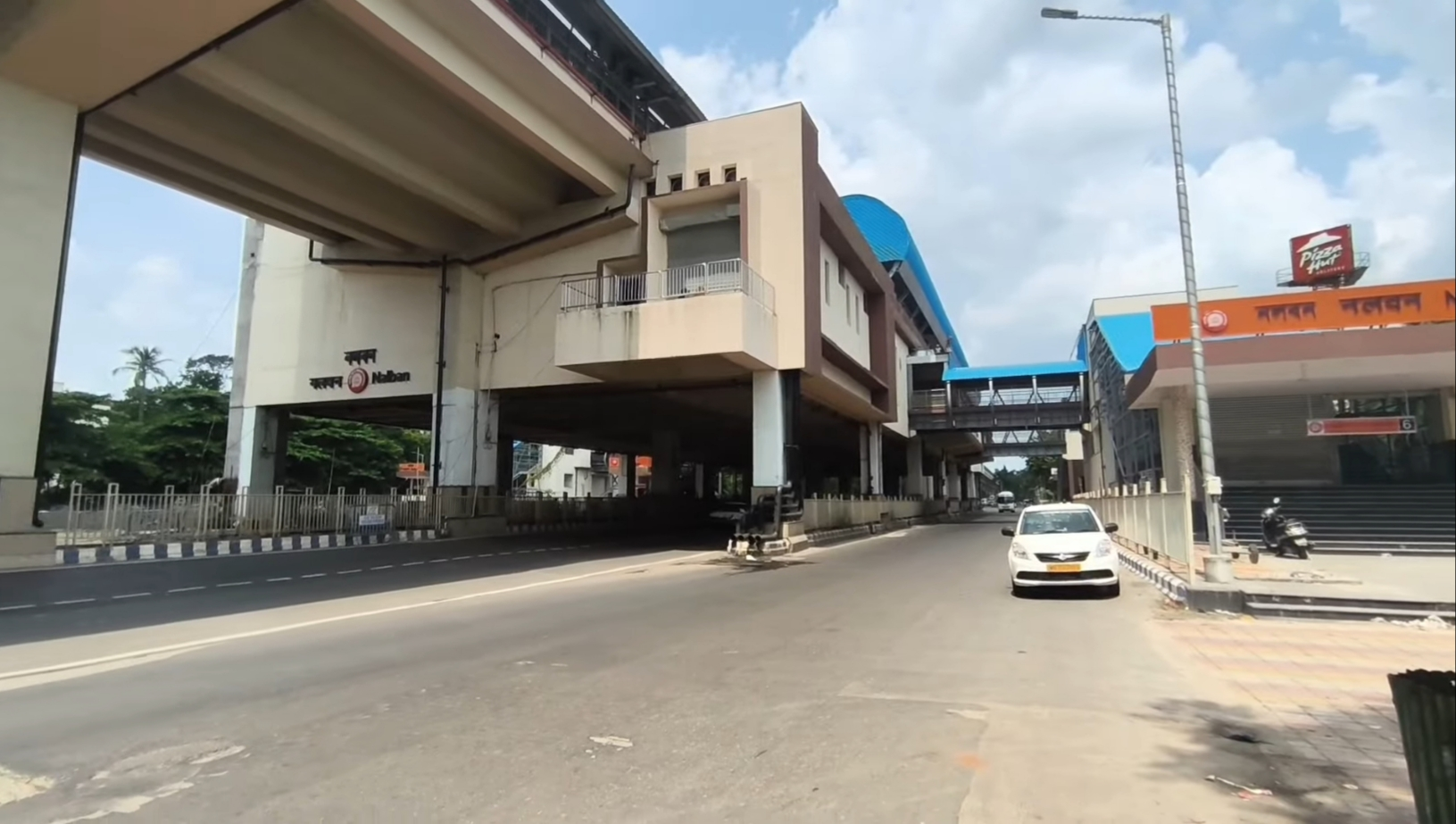
Nalban metro station

This station is located beside Nicco Park on the Salt Lake Bypass branch of Biswa Bangla Sarani at Nalban. The main elevated structure of the station in the middle of Biswa Bangla Sarani with footover bridges on either side othe road. It is geographically located at 22.5610117°N 88.4147441°E. The previous station of the station is Gour Kishore Ghosh metro station at a distance of 1.5 km (0.93 mi) and the next station is IT Centre metro station at a distance of 1.5 km (0.93 mi).

== History ==
This project was sanctioned in the budget of 2010–11 by Mamata Banerjee with a project deadline of six years. The execution of this project has been entrusted to RVNL at a cost of Rs 3951.98 crore. It will help to reduce travel time between the southern fringes of Kolkata to Netaji Subhas Chandra Bose International Airport. In October 2011, RVNL awarded Gammon India Limited, the tender for the construction of the metro corridor from VIP Bazar Metro Station to Nicco Park (Nalban metro station), including stations, as part of Package-II of Orange Line. In early 2020s, the construction of the metro station along with the metro line started. The station is still under construction after structural work completion. It is slated to be completed in March 2025. Alongside, there were several delays in filling viaduct gaps between Beleghata and Gour Kishore Ghosh. These delays were caused due to road blocks as these gaps span over busy Eastern Metropolitan Bypass and Chingrighata crossing. Currently, a 366 m (1,201 ft) viaduct gap between Chingrighata crossing and Gour Kishore Ghosh metro station is being filled, with current completion target set for August 2026. The station is expected to be operational by late-2026.

== Station ==
=== Structure ===
Nalban Metro Station is an elevated metro station and has a total of 3 levels. Station entrances and exits begin or end at the first level or ground level. Second-level or L1 or intermediate level houses station fare control, station agents, metro vending machines, crossovers, etc. The third level or L2 or the final level houses the platforms and rail tracks. The station is 200 meters long and 25 meters wide.

The station has four entrances and exits. The station is being built with state-of-the-art technology. In addition to staircases, it will be equipped with lifts and escalators. The station also has drinking water and toilet facilities.

=== Layout ===
L2	Side platform, Doors will open on the left
L2	Platform 1	Train towards Jai Hind (IT Centre) →
L2	Platform 2	← Train towards Kavi Subhash (Gour Kishore Ghosh)
L2	Side platform, Doors will open on the left
L1	Concourse	Fare control, station agent, Metro QR ticket vending machines, crossover
G	Street level	Exit/Entrance

== Power and signal systems ==
Like other stations and lines of Kolkata Metro, this station has 750 volt DC powered third rail. The electricity system will be used to operate the train.

Train movement at this station will be managed by communication based train control signaling system. With this signal system, trains can be operated at intervals of 90 seconds.

== Services ==
Services have not started from this station. Currently the station is under construction and is set to be opened in 2025.

== See also ==
- List of Kolkata Metro stations
