= Green Line (Kolkata Metro) =

Transit line in Kolkata, India

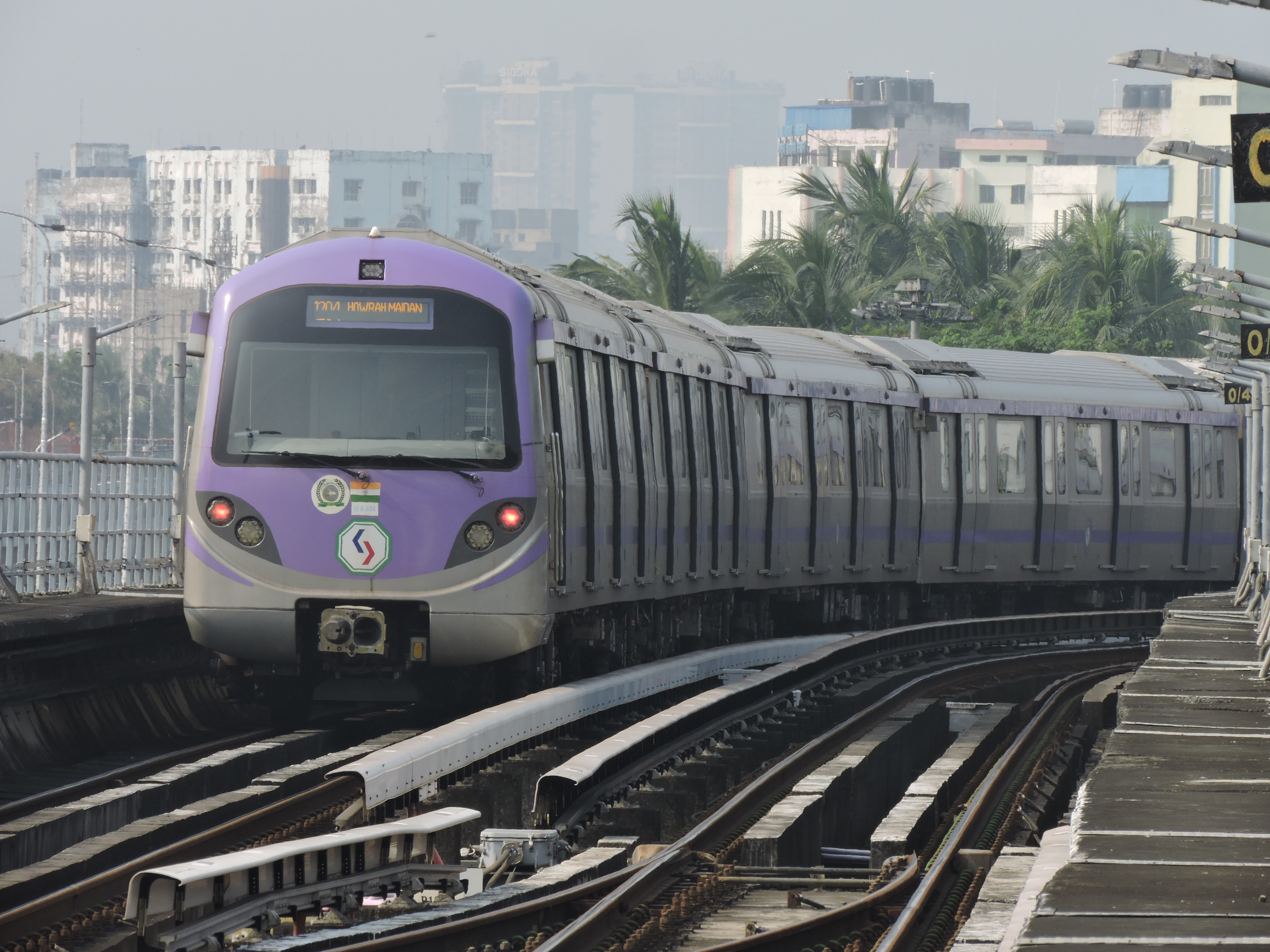
- A Howrah Maidan bound Green Line BEML Rake

Overview
- Status: Operational
- Owner: Indian Railways
- Locale: Kolkata Metropolitan Region
- Termini: Howrah Maidan (West); Salt Lake Sector-V (East)
- Connecting lines: Blue Line; Future: Purple Line; Orange Line
- Stations: Operational : 12; Approved : 5; Proposed : 7
- Website: kmrc.in

Service
- Type: Rapid transit
- System: Kolkata Metro
- Operator: Metro Railway, Kolkata
- Depot: Central Park
- Rolling stock: BEML
- Daily ridership: ~190,000

History
- Opened: 13 February 2020; 6 years ago
- Last extension: 22 August 2025; 14 months ago

Technical
- Line length: 17.6 km (10.9 mi)
- Num of tracks: 2
- Character: Elevated, Underground
- Track gauge: 1,435 mm (4 ft 8 1/2 in) standard gauge
- Electrification: 750 V DC third rail
- Operating speed: 80 km/h (50 mph)
- Signalling: CBTC signalling
Route Map
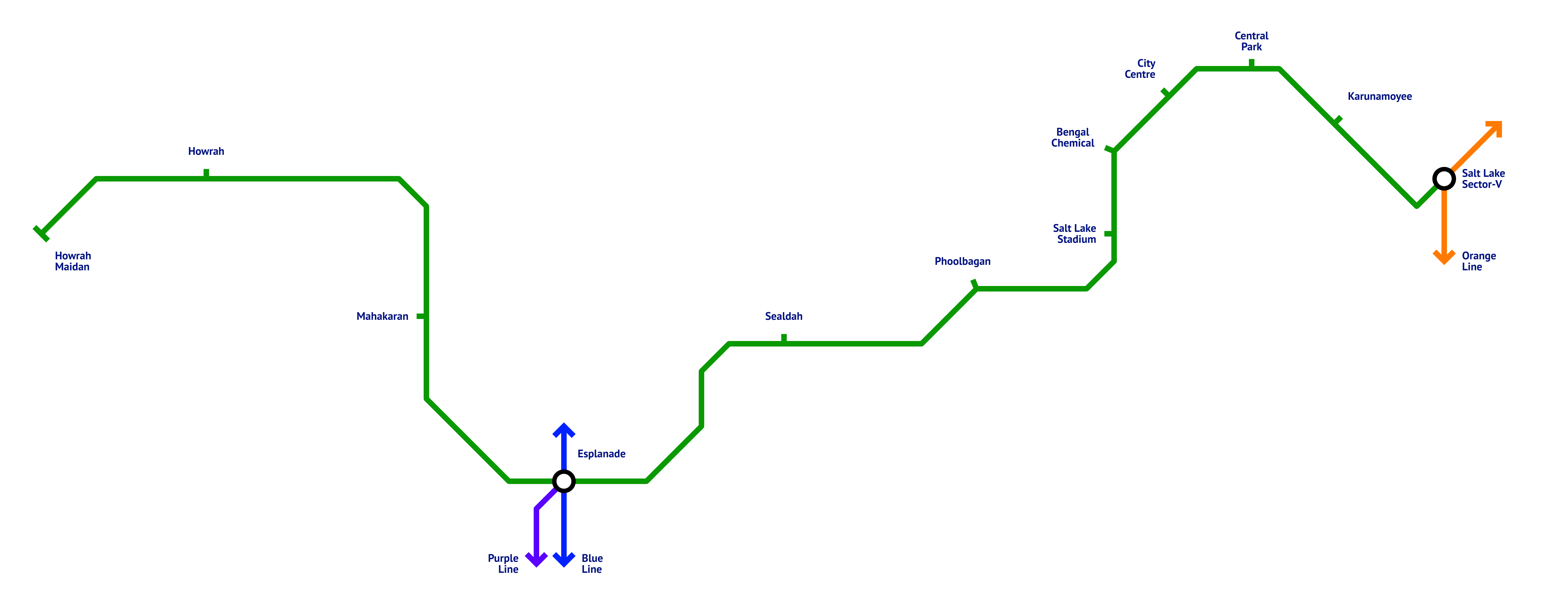

Green Line, also known as East–West Metro, is a rapid transit metro line of the Kolkata Metro in Kolkata, West Bengal, India. It is India's first underwater stretch metro that passes under the Hooghly River. It currently runs from Salt Lake Sector-V to Howrah Maidan by going underneath the Hooghly River. A future eastern extension from Sector-V to Teghoria and western extension from Howrah Maidan to Santragachi Bus Terminus are planned. It will cover a distance of 23.1 km (14.4 mi) and consist of 24 stations from Teghoria (Haldiram) in the east to Santragachi Bus Terminus in the west, of which it will consist of 18 elevated and 7 underground stations, and the operational section consists of 6 elevated and 6 underground stations, with a total distance of 15 km (9.3 mi).

The Green Line has India's first and biggest underwater metro tunnel, along with the deepest metro ventilation shaft. In the deepest metro shaft, the Howrah metro station is the deepest metro station in India, at a depth of 33 m (108 ft). The first phase between Salt Lake Sector V and Salt Lake Stadium was inaugurated by the then Minister of Railways, Shri Piyush Goyal, on 13 February 2020, and commercial services started from 14 February 2020. The underground stretch till Phoolbagan was opened on 4 October 2020 by the current Minister of Railways, Shri Ashwini Vaishnaw, and then till Sealdah was opened on 12 July 2022. The section between Esplanade and Howrah Maidan was inaugurated by Honb'le Prime Minister of India Shri Narendra Modi on 6 March 2024. The Esplanade and Sealdah section was inaugurated on 22 August 2025.

It is expected to derive a very high ridership, since it connects India's two largest commuter railway and long-distance railway terminals, Howrah, Sealdah, Shalimar Railway station and Santragachi Railway Station in the future along with two of its largest business districts, BBD Bagh and Salt Lake Sector V. At present, more than 100,000 passengers commute through the line every day, and this figure is expected to go up to 1 million by 2035. It also connects the industrial hub of Kolkata, i.e., Howrah and the IT hub of Kolkata, i.e., Salt Lake Sector-V. It has interchange with Blue Line and Purple at Esplanade and will eventually also connect with Orange at Salt Lake Sector V and Teghoria.

== History ==
The master plan had already identified the corridor way back in 1971. But the success of the Delhi Metro contributed to the sanction of the East–West Metro corridor, which would connect Howrah railway station with the satellite city of Salt Lake. In January 2004, the Vadodara-based Pacific Consultant International Group conducted a feasibility study for the line. The report proposed the route and tubular structures be under the Hooghly River, a distributary of the Ganga River.

A new organisation called the Kolkata Metro Rail Corporation Limited (KMRCL) was formed, which would be executing the operations of this line, by commencing construction in 2009. Of the KMRC's eight directors, four each were from the Governments of West Bengal and India. The cost was being shared between the state government as 30 percent, the Union Urban Development Ministry as 25 percent, and the Japan Bank for International Cooperation (JBIC) as 45 percent. But in 2011, after state government disinvested from the project, most of the share of this project went to Indian Railways, the owner of the Kolkata Metro, and with the JBIC. In 2012, the project was estimated at a cost of ₹5,000 crore (US$520 million), while by 2019, the cost had escalated to ₹8,996.96 crore (equivalent to ₹140 billion or US$1.4 billion in 2026).

Due to major setbacks, such as land acquisition, slum relocation, and route alignment problems, the project got delayed. The East-West Corridor was originally slated to be operational by 2012, but was later pushed back to 2015. The project was implemented in four phases. The first phase, from Salt Lake Sector V to Salt Lake Stadium, became operational on 13 February 2020. The second phase, to Phoolbagan opened on 4 October 2020. The third phase to Sealdah became operational from 14 July 2022, and part of the final phase between Esplanade and Howrah Maidan, which includes the journey through the tubular tunnels under the Hooghly River, became operational on 6 March 2024. This made the line and the Kolkata Metro the first metro to run underwater in India.

On 21 January 2025 trial runs started on the remaining gap between Esplanade and Sealdah, which was then opened on 22 August 2025. This connected the formerly two separate sections from Salt Lake Sector-V to Sealdah and Esplanade to Howrah Maidan together into one continuous line. This also completed the original 16-year construction project between Salt Lake Sector-V and Howrah Maidan after many years of hardships, delays and developmental work.

Just before the tunnel enters the underwater segment, lies a ventilation shaft on the Kolkata bank of Hooghly River, which is the deepest of its kind in India, at 44 metres (144 ft) below ground level.

== Current status ==
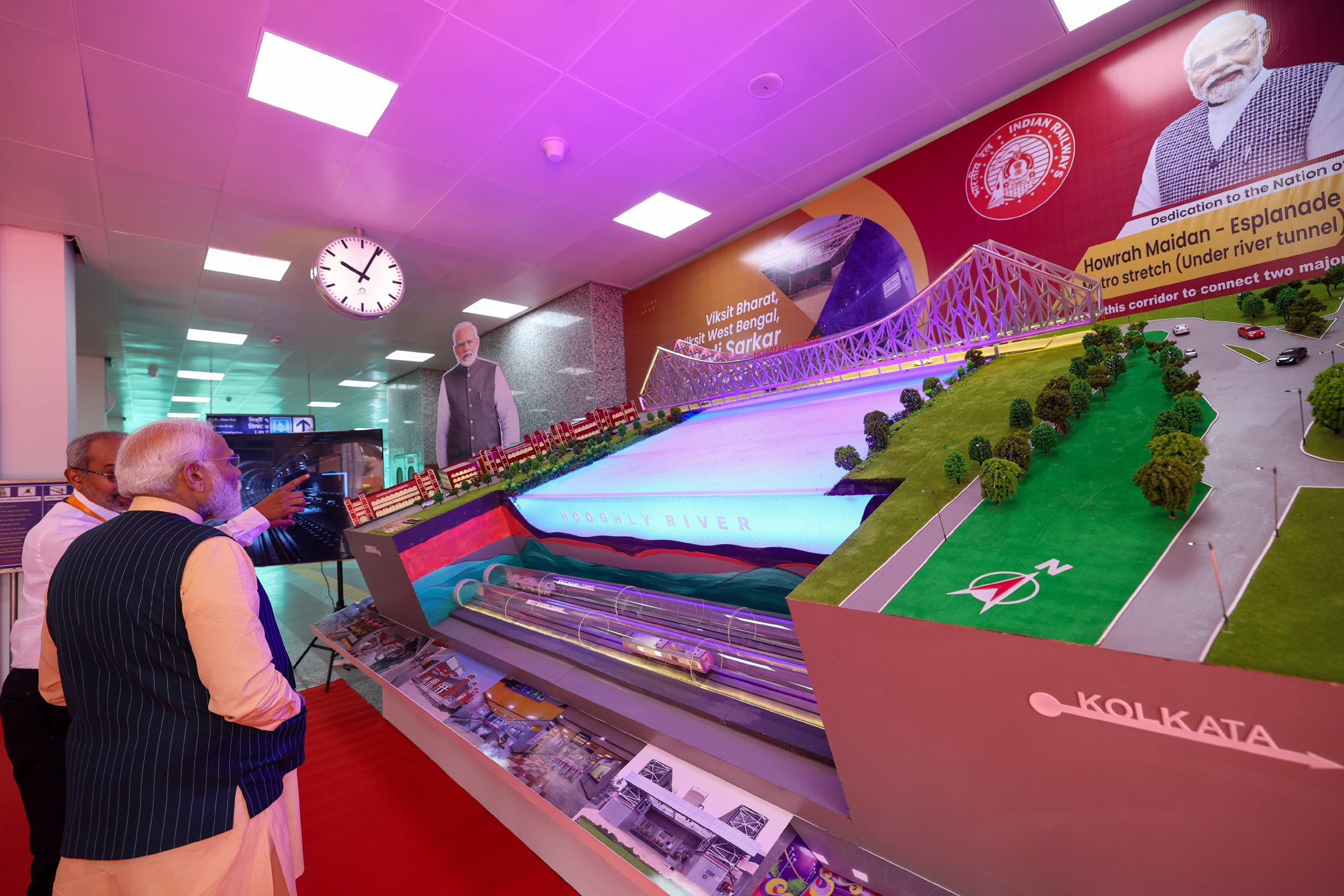
Artists Conception of East west underwater metro at Esplanade Metro station

East west metro tunnel underwater section

As of August 2025

- Elevated Corridor: The elevated section for Phase 1 is complete, including the last trials, from Salt Lake Sector V to Salt Lake Stadium. Commercial operations started on 14 February 2020.
- Tunnel for Phase 2: The construction of the 5,490 m (18,010 ft)-long tunnel has been completed. This section was constructed by ITD-ITD Cementation JV.
- Underground Stations for Phase 2: The works at Phoolbagan station was completed, and it is operational from 4 October 2020.
- Underground Stations for Phase 3: The Sealdah station was completed, and was inaugurated by the Minister of Women and Child Development, Smriti Irani, and is available for commercial usage from 14 July 2022.
- Tunnel for Phase 3: Tunneling work for phase 3 was completed. However, work at the shaft at Durga Pithuri Lane was ongoing.
- Underground Stations for Phase 4: Howrah Maidan, Howrah, Mahakaran and the new Esplanade were completed and were inaugurated on 6 March 2024.
- Tunnel work for phase 4: Both tunnels for phase 4 are complete. Tunneling between Esplanade and Sealdah was completed on 9 October 2020 and between Sealdah and Bowbazar shaft completed on 15 May 2021. Retrieval of the TBMs and covering of the shaft are completed. The last remaining gap between Esplanade and Sealdah stations was opened on 22 August 2025.
- Train Depot: Construction, electrical and mechanical work have been completed at Central Park depot, and it is presently operational.

== Timeline ==
The following dates represent the dates the section opened to the public, not the private inauguration.

History
Extension date	Terminals		Length
14 February 2020	Salt Lake Sector-V	Salt Lake Stadium	4.9 kilometers (3.0 mi)
4 October 2020	Salt Lake Stadium	Phoolbagan	1.7 kilometers (1.1 mi)
11 July 2022	Phoolbagan	Sealdah	2.3 kilometers (1.4 mi)
6 March 2024	Esplanade	Howrah Maidan	4.1 kilometers (2.5 mi)
22 August 2025	Sealdah	Esplanade	2.6 kilometers (1.6 mi)
Total	Salt Lake Sector-V	Howrah Maidan	15.7 kilometers (9.8 mi)

== Stations ==
Green Line
#	Station Name		Station Code	Distance (km)	Opening	Connections	Layout	Platform Type
#	English	Bengali	Station Code	Distance (km)	Opening	Connections	Layout	Platform Type
1	Teghoria	তেঘরিয়া	-		Approved (Land Acquisition underway)	Orange Line VIP Road (Under Construction)	Underground	TBD
2	Raghunathpur	রঘুনাথপুর	-		Approved (Land Acquisition underway)		Elevated	TBD
3	Baguiati	বাগুইআটি	-		Approved (Land Acquisition underway)		Elevated	TBD
4	Kestopur	কেষ্টপুর	-		Approved (Land Acquisition underway)		Elevated	TBD
5	Krishnapur	কৃষ্ণপুর	-		Approved (Land Acquisition underway)		Elevated	TBD
6	Salt Lake Sector-V	সল্টলেক সেক্টর-৫	SVSA	0	14 February 2020	Orange Line IT Centre (Under Construction)	Elevated	Side
7	Karunamoyee	করুণাময়ী	KESA	1.227	14 February 2020		Elevated	Side
8	Central Park	সেন্ট্রাল পার্ক	CPSA	0.803	14 February 2020		Elevated	Side
9	City Center	সিটি সেন্টার	CCSC	0.933	14 February 2020		Elevated	Side
10	Bengal Chemical	বেঙ্গল কেমিক্যাল	BCSD	1.127	14 February 2020		Elevated	Side
11	Salt Lake Stadium	সল্টলেক স্টেডিয়াম	SSSA	0.795	14 February 2020		Elevated	Side
12	Phoolbagan	ফুলবাগান	PBGB	1.695	4 October 2020		Underground	Island
13	Sealdah	শিয়ালদহ	SDHM	2.305	11 July 2022	Sealdah	Underground	Side & Island
14	Esplanade	এসপ্ল্যানেড	KESP	2.631	6 March 2024	Blue Line; Purple Line (Under Construction)	Underground	Side & Island
15	Mahakaran	মহাকরণ	MKNA	0.878	6 March 2024		Underground	Island
16	Howrah	হাওড়া	HWHM	2.206	6 March 2024	Howrah; Howrah Station Jetty	Underground	Side & Island
17	Howrah Maidan	হাওড়া ময়দান	HWMM	1.057	6 March 2024		Underground	Island
18	Foreshore Road	ফোরশোর রোড	-		Proposed		Underground	TBD
19	Coal Depot	কোল ডিপো	-		Proposed		Underground	TBD
20	Shalimar	শালিমার	-		Proposed	Shalimar	Underground	TBD
21	Nabanna	নবান্ন	-		Proposed		Elevated	TBD
22	Belepole	বেলেপোল	-		Proposed		Elevated	TBD
23	Bakshara	বাকসাঁড়া	-		Proposed		Elevated	TBD
24	Santragachi	সাঁতরাগাছি	-		Proposed	Santragachi	Elevated	TBD
25	Santragachi Bus Terminus	সাঁতরাগাছি বাস টার্মিনাস	-		Proposed		Elevated	TBD

== Inauguration ==
=== 1st Phase ===
On 3 February 2020, the final inauguration date was revealed. After 11 years, since the construction started, the first phase of the line was inaugurated on 13 February by Union Minister of Railways Piyush Goyal, with commercial services to start the very next day. The service will start from 8 am and ends at 8 pm, with 37 pairs of services a day. 5 rakes would run at a frequency of 20 minutes. Dipak Kumar drove the first train.

In October 2020, services up to Phoolbagan were extended as a part of Phase 1A.

=== 2nd Phase ===
On 14 July 2022, the first commercial run from Sealdah metro station was made, as a part of Phase 2.

=== 3rd Phase ===
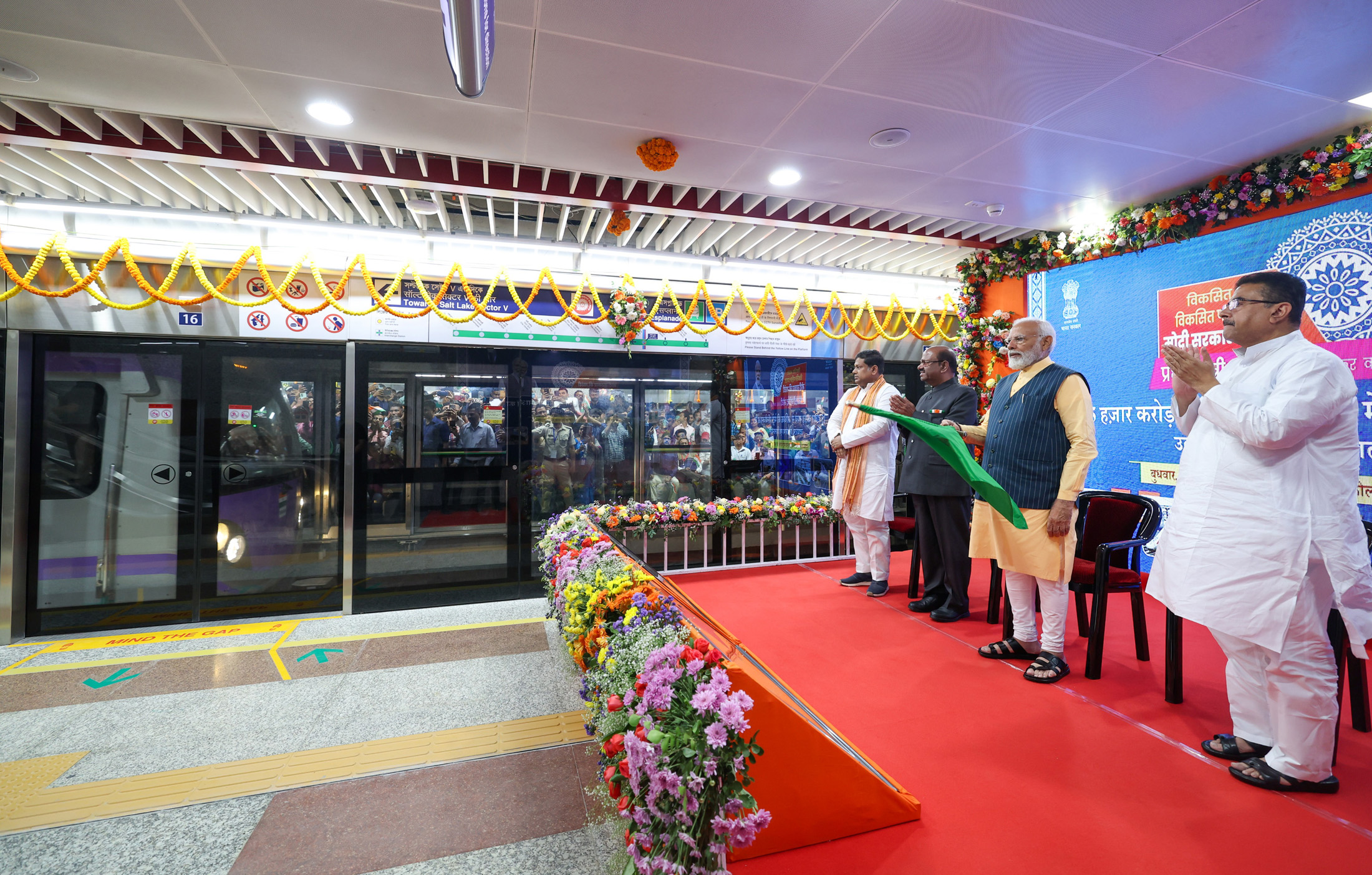
Prime Minister Narendra Modi inaugurating the Esplanade–Howrah Maidan stretch of the line on 6 March 2024 from Esplanade metro station

On 6 March 2024, the truncated route between Esplanade and Howrah Maidan was opened by Prime Minister Narendra Modi.

=== 4th Phase ===
On 22 August 2025, the remaining Sealdah–Esplanade section was opened by Prime Minister Modi, connecting the formerly two separate sections from Salt Lake Sector-V to Sealdah and Esplanade to Howrah Maidan together into one continuous line.

== Infrastructure ==
=== Stations ===
All the stations in this line are equipped with Platform Screen Doors to keep people away from the tracks for greater safety. Mott MacDonald is the detailed design consultant for all the elevated stations, whereas Lee Harris Pomeroy Architects have designed all the underground stations. Out of the 6 underground stations, 3 have been built by ITD Cementation, a part of the Italian-Thai Development Public Company, and the other 3 by Afcons Infrastructure, including the 520 meters underwater stretch. All the elevated stations were built by Kolkata-based Simplex Infrastructure ltd.

=== Escalators and elevators ===
90 escalators and 40 elevators have been installed at different levels in the line to facilitate smooth mobility of passengers, including physically challenged and aged persons. The Letter of Award (LoA) for installation of forty-one escalators and twenty-six elevators for 8 stations of Phase-I has been awarded.

=== Tunnel Ventilation System (TVS) ===
TVS provides a means to control smoke flow and ensure safe evacuation of passengers in case of a fire, as well as maintain an acceptable environment in the tunnel and station track ways. The Tender for the TVS was invited and the bids of eligible tenderers evaluated.

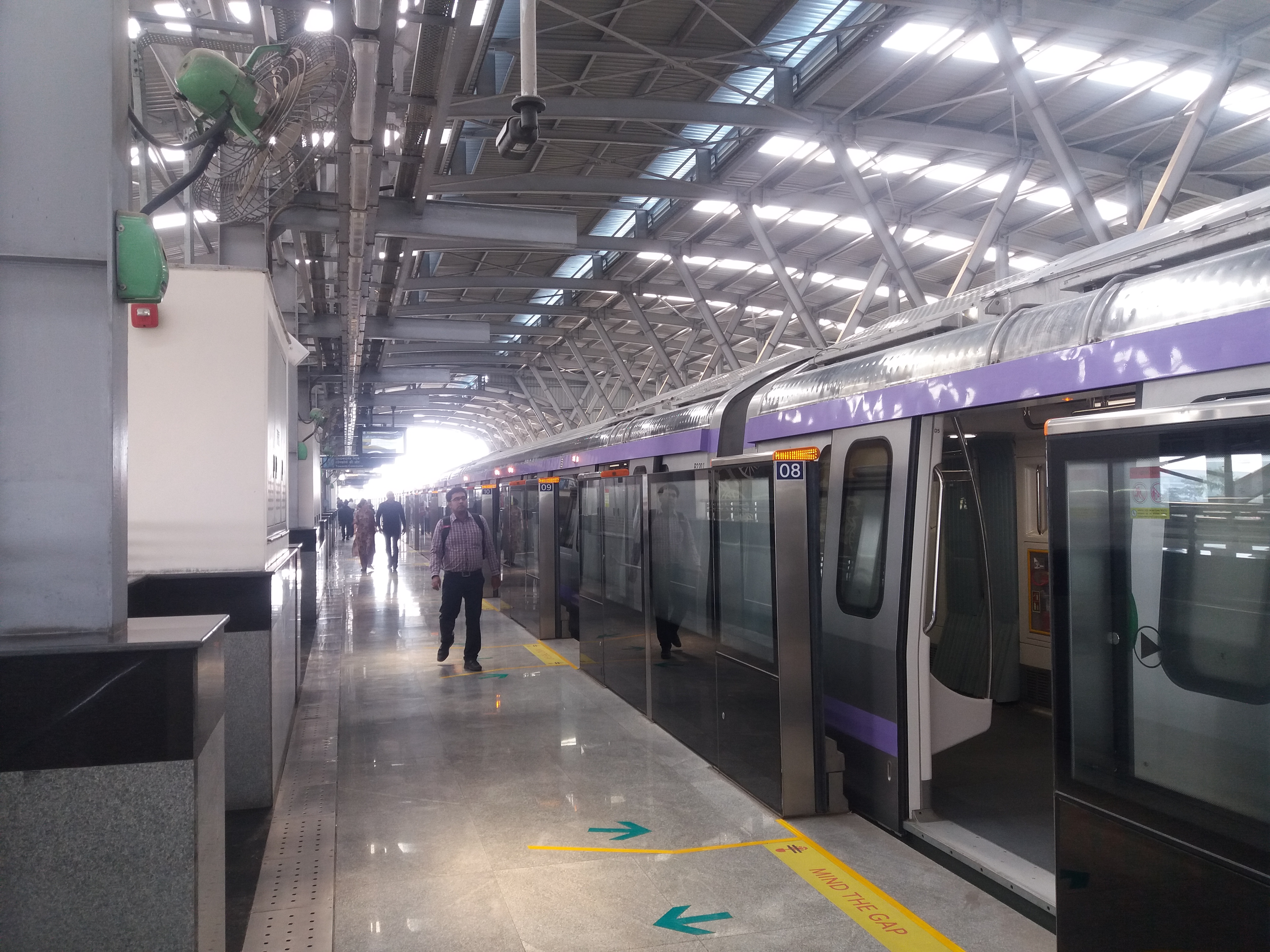
Platform Screen Doors at the Salt Lake Stadium metro station

=== Platform Screen Doors (PSDs) ===
The PSDs are a system of full height/half height motorized sliding doors that provide controlled access to the trains and protect the platform edges. The PSD work for 6 elevated and 6 underground stations have been completed.

=== Electrification, signaling and automatic fare collection ===
The line has two types of signaling equipment supplied by ANSALDO STS. One is the feature cab signaling and another is the continuous automatic train control with automatic train protection. The other signaling equipment includes an integrated system featuring a fiber optic cable, SCADA, radios and a PA system. The line also has a train information system, control telephones and a centralized clock system. The contract for AFC works has been awarded to M/s. Indra Sistemas SA (Spain).

=== Operations ===
Like the north–south corridor, the east–west metro runs from 6:30 am to 10:20 pm (Monday to Saturday) and 9 am to 10:20 pm (Sundays) at a frequency of 6 minutes during peak hours and 12 minutes during non-peak hours.

== Rolling stock ==
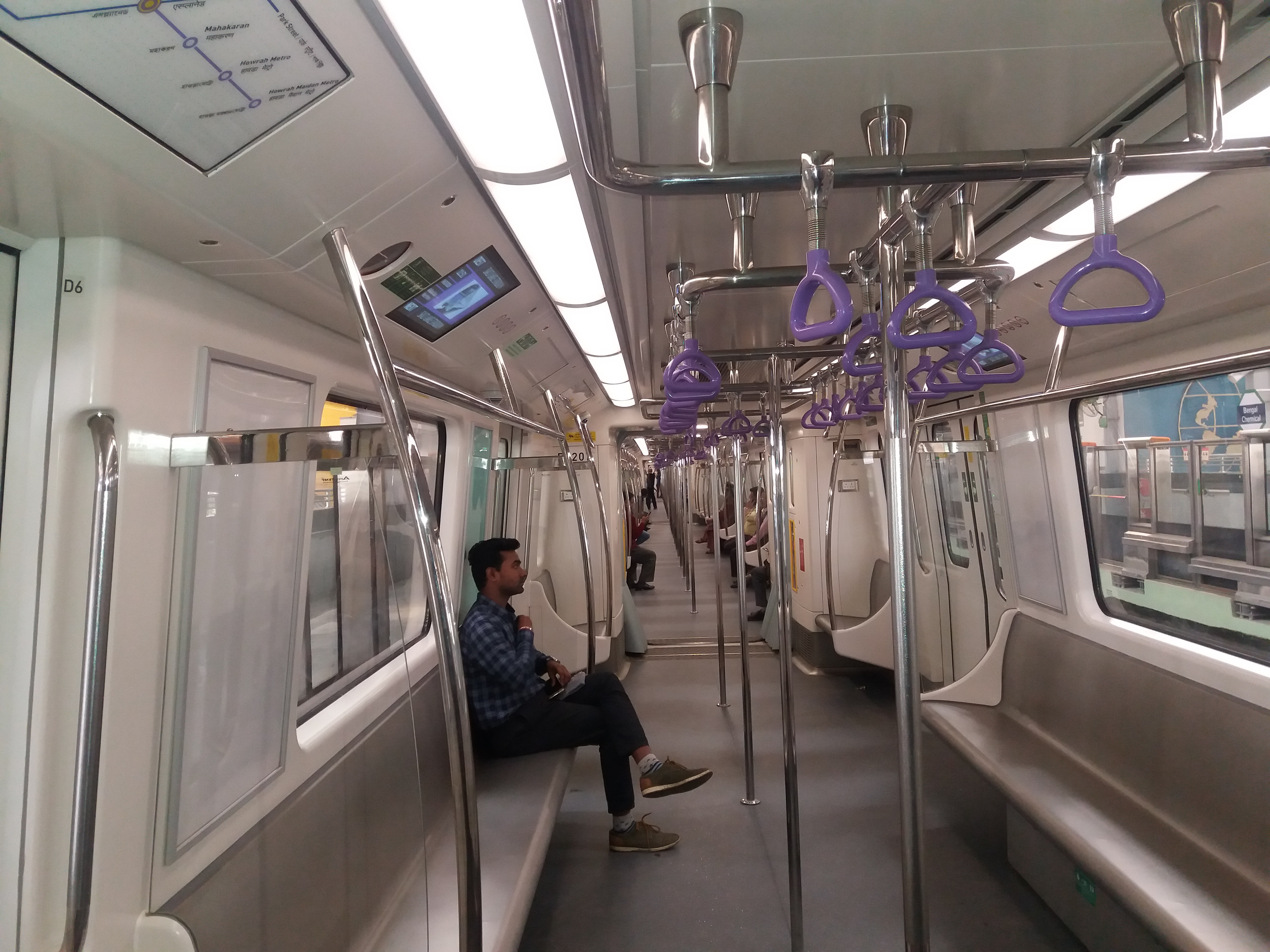
The interior of the East-West Metro rake

The Construcciones y Auxiliar de Ferrocarriles (CAF), in collaboration with Melco, was to supply 14 trains for this line. The 14 rakes were acquired at a cost of approximately €110m ₹600 crore (US$62 million). Each rake composes of 6 coaches having a capacity of 2,068 people per train. The maximum speed of the train is 90 km/h (56 mph). The first lot of trains was to be manufactured in Spain and imported to Kolkata in November 2014. The next lot was to be manufactured in India. However, the tender was cancelled by the Kolkata Metro Rail Corporation (KMRC) due to technical reasons, and excessive delay in project. Then, a re-tender was issued in July 2015. The Bharat Earth Movers Limited (BEML) emerged as the only bidder in the fourth round of bidding for providing the rolling stock. Thus, the contract for providing the rakes was awarded to the BEML. The BEML has earlier provided rakes for Delhi Metro, Bengaluru Metro and Jaipur Metro. Fourteen rakes, each with six coaches, were ordered. Out of 14, 11 rakes have already been received by the KMRC.

== Tunnel lights ==
In December 2023, Kolkata Metro added blue light in the underwater tunnel section to give passengers a sense of feeling under Hooghly River alongside other lights in the tunnel.

== Proposed extensions ==
The Government of West Bengal has proposed an extension to the East–West Metro line. According to this proposal, the East–West Metro will have 3 terminating stations at Howrah Maidan, Salt Lake Sector-V and the proposed Teghoria station. In Teghoria, it will be connected to the Airport-bound Orange Line, and interconnection facilities will be present. It was previously planned that the extension and the present route would converge at the Central Park Station. But now the plan is changed and it is decided to extend the line directly from Salt Lake Sector V Station. The proposed extension is under study and it will need several clearances before being implemented. Another 10 km (6.2 mi) East-West Metro extension project from Howrah Maidan to Santragachi bus terminus has also been proposed. Rail India Technical and Economic Service (RITES), and the implementing agency for this project was planned to start work on the corridor early in 2017.

== Timeline ==
- 2009: Contract for building the overground stations and viaduct awarded to Gammon and Simplex Infrastructure.
- 2009: Contract for building the underground section from Subhash Sarabor to Central Station awarded to ITD-ITD Cementation JV.
- 2009-February: Physical Construction of EW corridor starts.
- 2010: Contract for building the underground section from Central to Howrah Maidan awarded to Afcons.
- 2012: KMRC awards rolling stock contract to Spain's Construcciones y Auxiliar de Ferrocarriles (CAF).
- 2012: Realignment proposed to avoid shifting of 80 families from Bowbazar and hawkers from Brabourne Road.
- 2014: CAF withdraws from the KMRC rolling stock contract due to cost escalation.
- 2015: Realignment approved by Railways and JICA in between Sealdah to Howrah station.
- 2015: Subodh Mullick Square station, a key stop in the revised blueprint, done away with to avoid eviction of hawkers.
- 2015: Complete elevated tracks other than 365 metres (1,198 ft) at Duttabad ready.
- 2016-February: Rolling stock contract for 14 rakes having 6 coaches awarded to BEML.
- 2017-January: Structural and Roofing work of all elevated stations completed.
- 2017-March: Work starts at 365 metres (1,198 ft) of elevated section at Duttabad after resettlement of affected household. Elevated section is to be made of steel girders.
- 2017-March: Afcons nicknames the tunnel boring machine as Prerna and Rachna inspired from the names of daughter of their employee.
- 2017-May 23: First TBM completes tunneling the East bound tunnel under the Hoogly river.
- 2017-June 21: Second TBM completes tunneling the West bound tunnel under the river Hoogly.
- 2017-June: Permission received from Archaeological Survey of India for construction of tunnel within 100 metres (328 ft) of three heritage buildings.
- 2017-July: Tram depot at Esplanade shifted to facilitate construction of Metro Station.
- 2017-July: People from 11 buildings in Brebourne Road evacuated in phased manner when the TBM's passes below these old buildings.
- 2017-August: Mini-bus stand at Mahakaran shifted to facilitate the construction of underground station.
- 2017-September: Panasonic Manufacturing and Zhuzhou CRRC Times Electric have been awarded contract of platform screen door on all 12 stations.
- 2017-October: 365 m of elevated section at Duttabad completed using steel girders.
- 2017-December: Tunnelling between Mahakaran station and Esplanade station ongoing.
- 2017-December: KMRC declares first phase to be in between Sector V and IFA Salt Lake Stadium instead of Phoolbagan to be inaugurated in June 2018.
- 2018-January: Demo coach arrives at IFA Salt Lake Metro Depot. People question its use.
- 2018-February 12: Metro general manager Mr. Ajay Vijayvargiya again postpones opening of first phase from June to September 2018.
- 2018-February: Constantly KMRC and Railways have postponed the opening of Phase 1 (the new deadline was before October 2018) and truncated the route for Phase 1 from Sealdah to Phoolbagan and now only till Salt lake Sec V.
- 2018-March 23: First TBM named Prerna reaches Esplanade station completing the section from Howrah Maidan to Esplanade. This tunnel will be used by Howrah bound tunnel.
- 2018-March 31: BEML delivers first metro train set to KMRC. The train sets to arrive in 20 days. Second train set will be delivered in the end of April.
- 2018-April 5: Second TBM completes boring of second tunnel between Howrah Maidan and Esplanade station.
- 2018-April 20: First metro rake arrives at IFA Salt Lake Depot.
- 2018-May 1: The second metro rake from BEML arrives.
- 2018-June 20: First test ride inside depot starts.
- 2018-June 27: Work at Esplanade Sealdah tunnel drilling stalled due to existing steel structure on Blue Line.
- 2018-July 4: First trial run between Central Park and Sector V.
- 2018-July: October deadline of inauguration announced
- 2018-August: Tunneling from Esplanade to Sealdah suspend due to detection of underground steel beams of Blue Line.
- 2018-August: Due to fund crunch & other issues, initial run postponed to March 2019.
- 2018-August 30: Installation of Platform Screen Doors started in Karunamoyee and Central Park stations.
- 2018-October: Trial Runs conducted between Sector V and IFA Salt Lake Stadium stations.
- 2018-November: Trial Runs conducted by RDSO between Sector V and IFA Salt Lake Stadium stations.
- 2018-November: Speed limit of trains plying on Blue Line decreased due to removal of steel beams.
- 2018-November: Small tunnels being made using NATM method at Esplanade to remove steel beams left during North-South Metro construction in the 1980s.
- 2018-December: Issues in software detected.
- 2019-January 25: Tunneling on Esplanade Sealdah section begins. TBM named Chandi starts its initial push from Esplanade station. It will take 12–15 months to complete the tunnelling.
- 2019-February 19: Second boring machine named Urvi starts tunnelling from Esplanade station.
- 2019-February: Fare chart released.
- 2019-April: Glitches detected during software integration while negotiating curves in line (First phase of the project till Salt Lake Stadium). Glitches have been fixed, and the signalling and communication firm Ansaldo STS has recommended 1000 hours of trial run before commencement of service.
- 2019-April: Inauguration delayed again. Misses April end deadline. New deadline June
- 2019-May: Tunnel boring machine Urvi and Chandi after initial slow start progressing steadily towards Sealdah.
- 2019-May 18: Gets RDSO clearance, and railway board nod.
- 2019-May 31: Electrification of third rail and trail run in underground section from IFA Salt Lake Stadium & Phoolbagan stations. It was the first time after 1995 that a metro trial was held underground.
- 2019-June 14: Inspection by fire department. Says, inadequate emergency exits in Bengal Chemical & IFA Saltlake Stadium stations.
- 2019-June 15: Gets international safety nod from French certifier.
- 2019-July 3: TBMs Rachna & Prerna successfully taken out from Curzon Park
- 2019-July 7: Fire dept. assures temporary permission to the 2 stations, Bengal Chemical & IFA Saltlake Stadium stations. NOC to be valid for a year.
- 2019-July 18: Operations handed over to Metro Railway, Kolkata from Kolkata Metro Rail Corporation
- 2019-July 23: CRS inspection and safety audit for initial run. But, Fire department delayed the NOC.
- 2019-July 30: Opening rescheduled on September. Smart Card released. Employees of Metro Railway, Kolkata being trained by Kolkata Metro Rail Corporation.
- 2019-August 2: CRS nod given, with 3 month validity of the clearance.
- 2019-August 12: India's deepest metro station, Howrah (30 m (98 ft)) finishes structural construction. It took 17 months.
- 2019-August 21: Trial till Sealdah crossover and 7-day mock trial started.
- 2019-September 1: Tunnel boring machine Chandi hits an aquifer causing massive soil settlement. Multiple buildings including the Futnani Chambers were damaged, hundreds had to be moved to hotels
- 2019-October: By the mid of the month, the land was stabled by grouting and no more subsidence recorded. High Court ordered to stop tunneling, till further notice.
- 2019-October 30: First round of service trials started.
- 2019 October: The first phase of this line was scheduled to start its first commercial run on 24 October, the same day when the first metro in India, Blue Line was inaugurated in 1984
- 2019-October 24: But the date was postponed to 7 November for some technical reasons.
- 2019-October 30: Second round of service trials started.
- 2019 November 8: The Metro Authority was also unable to start its inaugural run on 7 November also. Failure drill started and performed till 18 November.
- 2019-November 26: Initial CRS deadline expired. 3 months grace period given. Valid till 29 February 2020.
- 2019-December: New opening date planned, i.e., December end. But, it was missed again.
- 2020-January 7: High Court asks Railways to file report on resuming East-West Metro tunneling work, that was stopped after Bowbazar mishap.
- 2020-January 28: 2022 is the revised deadline of the entire corridor.
- 2020-February 3: Last group of 2 families moved to new flats from hotel after the Bowbazar mishap. Final inauguration date announced. Rail Minister to flag off services on 13 February.
- 2020-February 11: Last trials, known as 'time-table trials' conducted. The High Court gives nod to resume construction in Bowbazar area.
- 2020-February 13: First phase from Salt Lake Sector V to IFA Salt Lake Stadium inaugurated.
- 2020-February 14: Commercial services start.
- 2020-February 28: Tunneling resumed in Bowbazar area, and cracks redevelop in buildings.
- 2020-March: All operations and constructions stopped due to country-wide coronavirus lockdown.
- 2020-June 18: IFA Salt Lake Stadium to Phoolbagan section gets CRS nod.
- 2020-August 10: India's deepest evacuation shaft on Strand Road gets completed.
- 2020-October 2: The Vidyapati Setu (Sealdah Flyover) has been closed by Kolkata Police due to the work of making tunnel by TBM under this dilapidated bridge had started.
- 2020-October 4: Services extended up to Phoolbagan.
- 2020-October 8: Indian Football Association, West Bengal announced that the name of Salt Lake Stadium Metro Station has renamed as IFA Salt Lake Stadium.
- 2020-October 9: Work on the eastbound tunnel (towards Salt Lake Sector V) has been completed, TBM Urvi entered the under-construction Sealdah metro station on around 5 PM. Earlier, on 4 October 2020, the Vidyapati Setu (Sealdah Flyover) was reopened by Kolkata Police for vehicular traffic, as the tunneling work had completed 13 hours before.
- 2021-January 4: TBM Urvi starts bridging the last 800 m (2,600 ft) gap of E-W Metro tunnel from Sealdah to Esplanade.
- 2021-May 15: TBM Urvi reaches Bowbazar shaft. Last tunneling section of the entire project completed.
- 2022-May 11: Another subsidence struck at Bowbazar causing major damage to several buildings similar to that of September 2019.
- 2022-July 12: Services extended up to Sealdah.
- 2023-April 21: Kolkata Metro runs first underwater passenger trial run between Esplanade and Howrah Maidan .
- 2023-December: Kolkata Metro adds blue light in the underwater tunnel section to give passengers a sense of feeling under the Hooghly River.
- 2024-March 6: The Esplanade–Howrah Maidan section of the Green Line inaugurated by Prime Minister Narendra Modi (along with the truncated sections of Taratala–Majerhat under Purple Line and Kavi Subhash–Hemanta Mukhopadhyay under Orange Line).
- 2024-March 15: The Esplanade–Howrah Maidan section of the metro opens for travel to general public.
- 2024-September 6: The remaining Esplanade-Sealdah section tunneling work caused persistent cracks and water leaks in local buildings at Bowbazar where the 52 people have been evacuated, which is the epicentre of issue for metro authorities since 2019.
- 2024-December 17:After TBM Urvi completed its tunnelling, a 38 m (125 ft) critical gap of westbound tunnel was still completed. This part was completed carefully by traditional cut and cover method.
- 2025-January 13: Trial run successfully conducted in westbound tunnel between Sealdah and Esplanade.
- 2025-August 22: The Sealdah-Esplanade section was opened. This connected the formerly two separate sections from Salt Lake Sector-V to Sealdah and Esplanade to Howrah Maidan together into one continuous line.

== Gallery ==
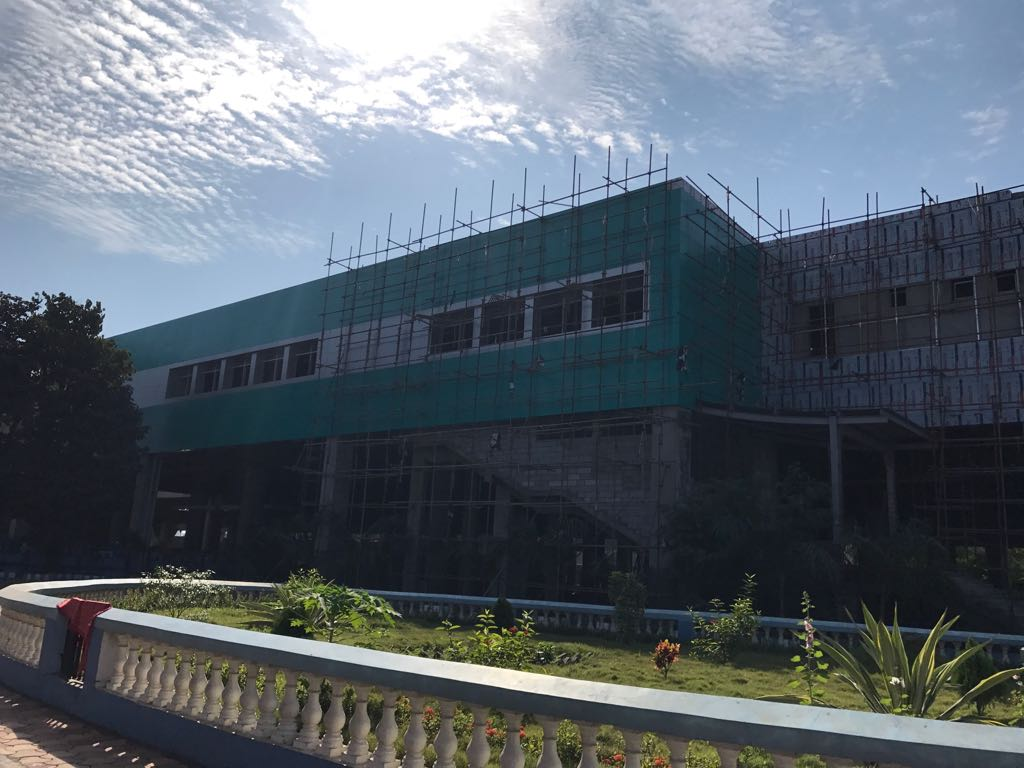

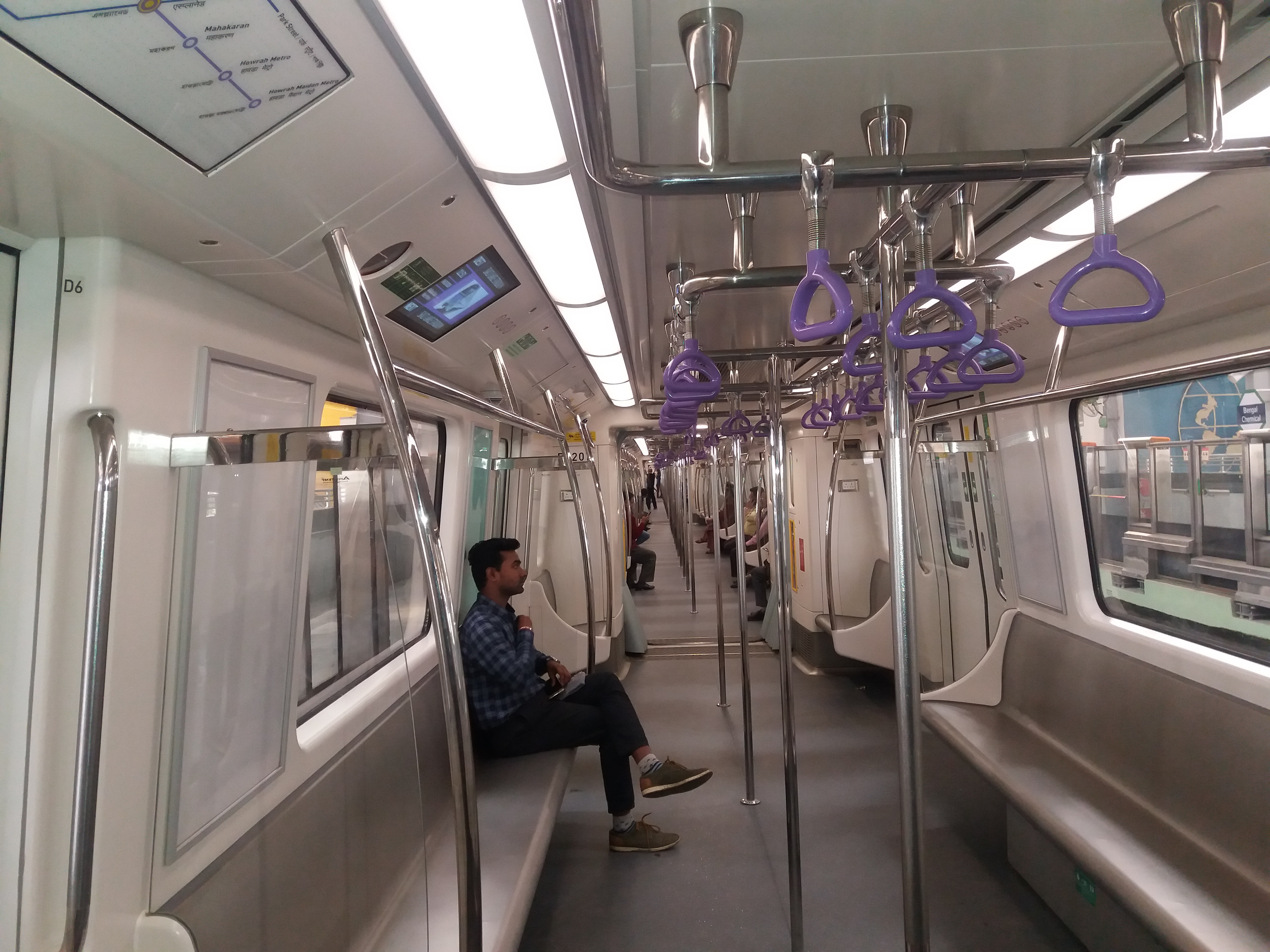

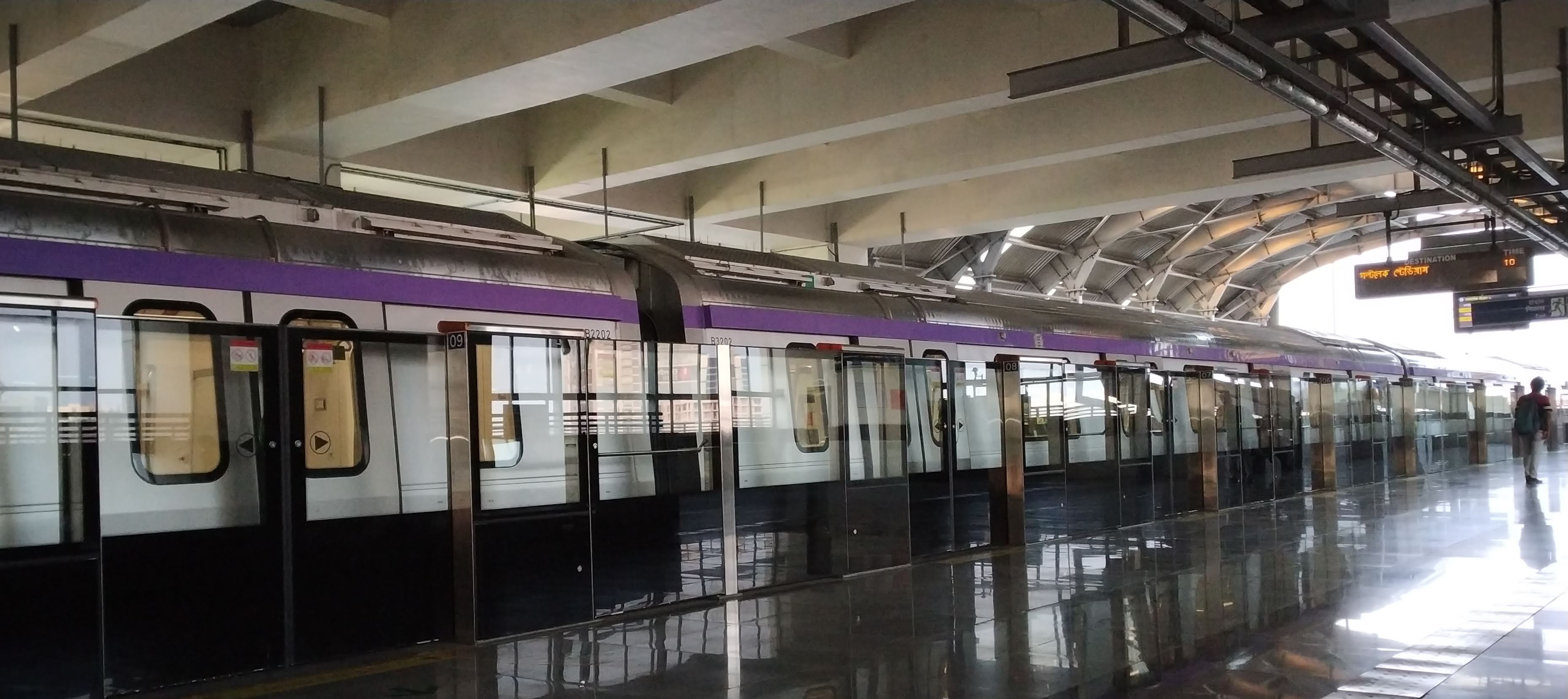

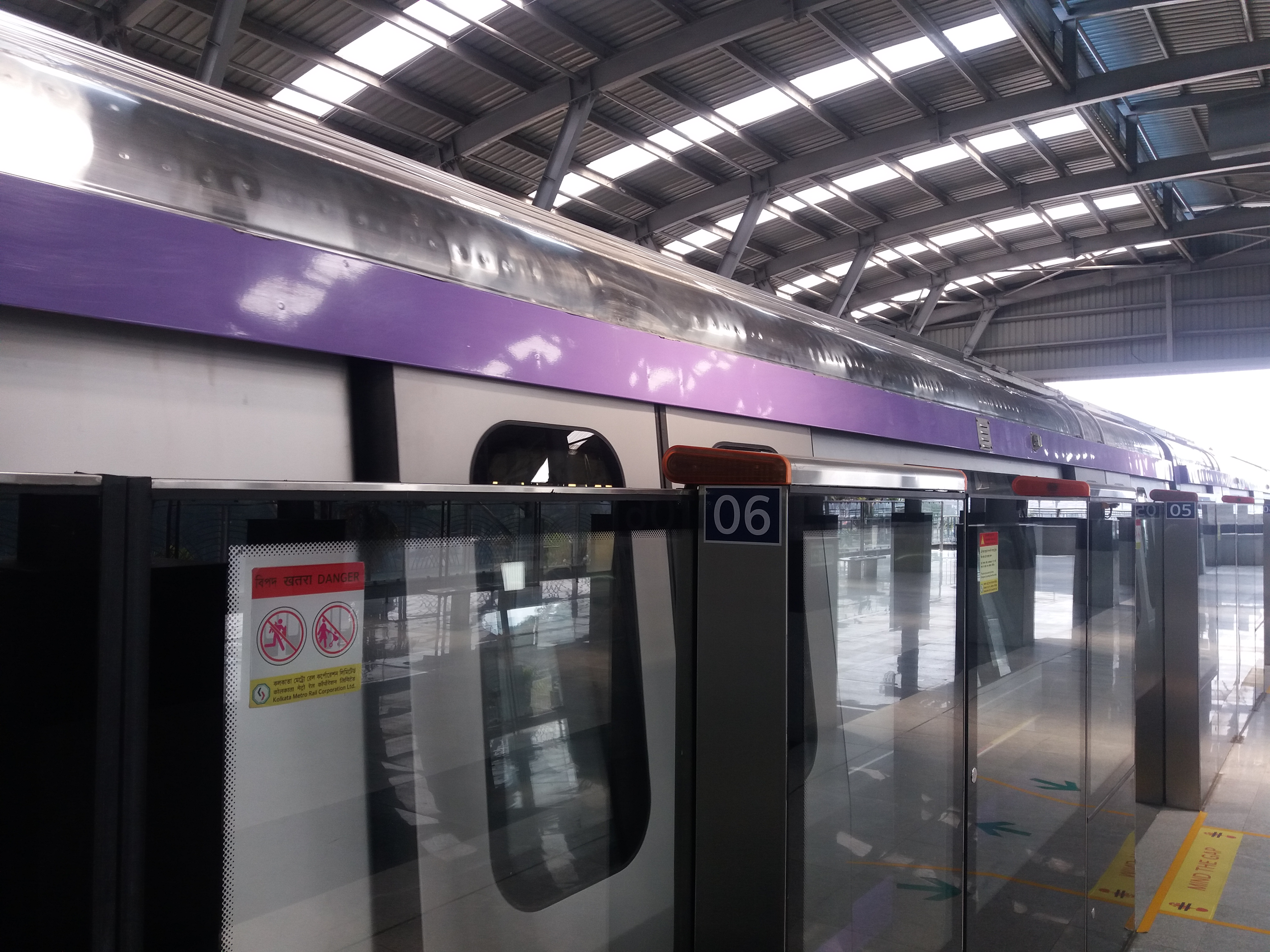

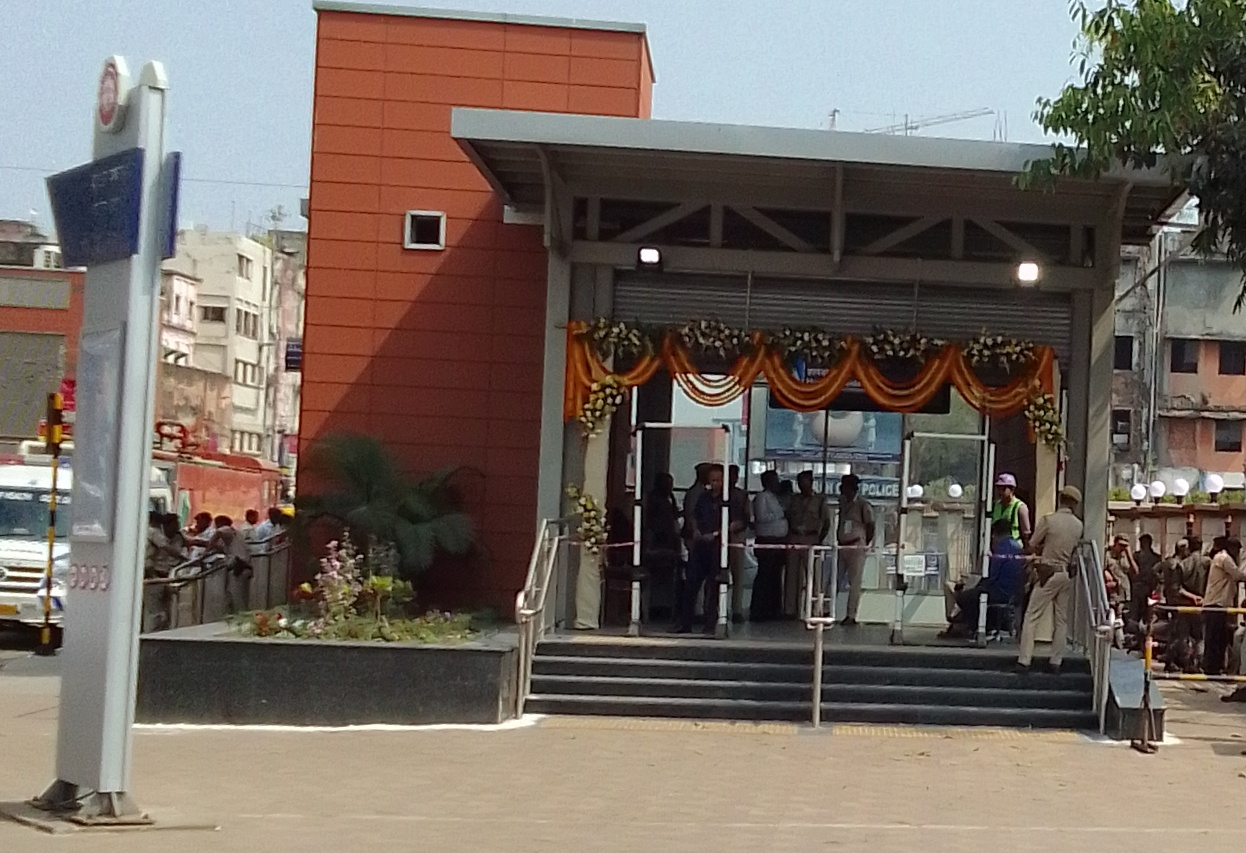

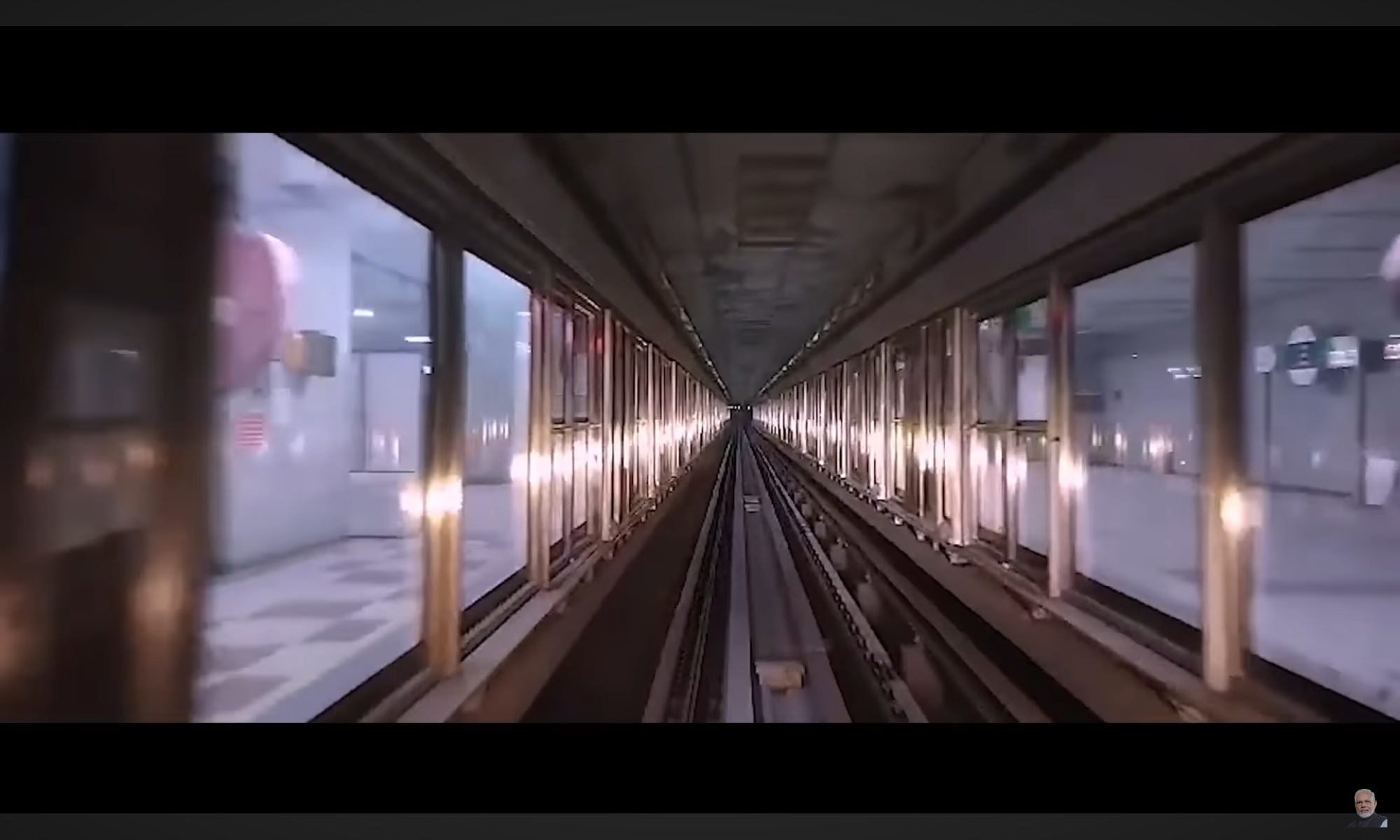

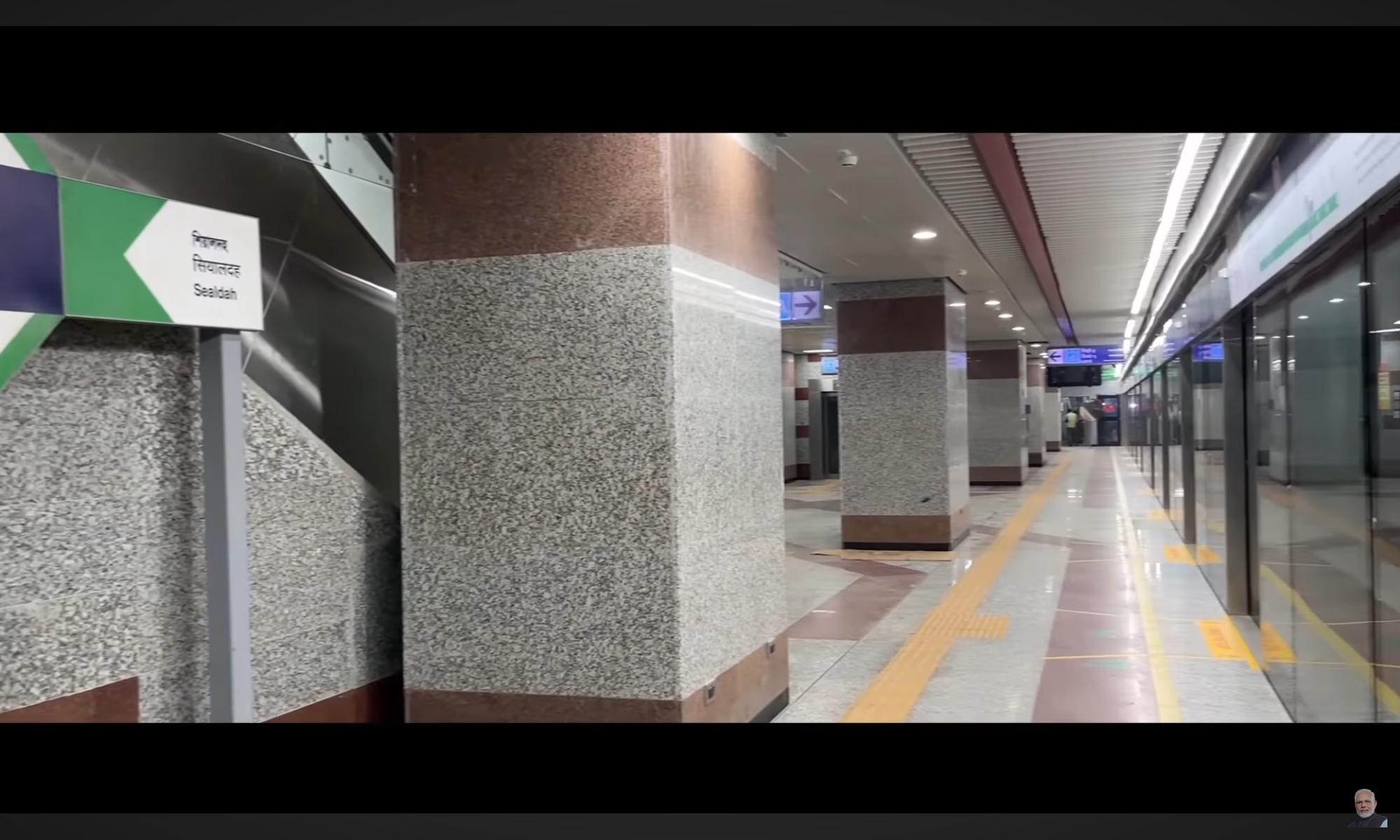

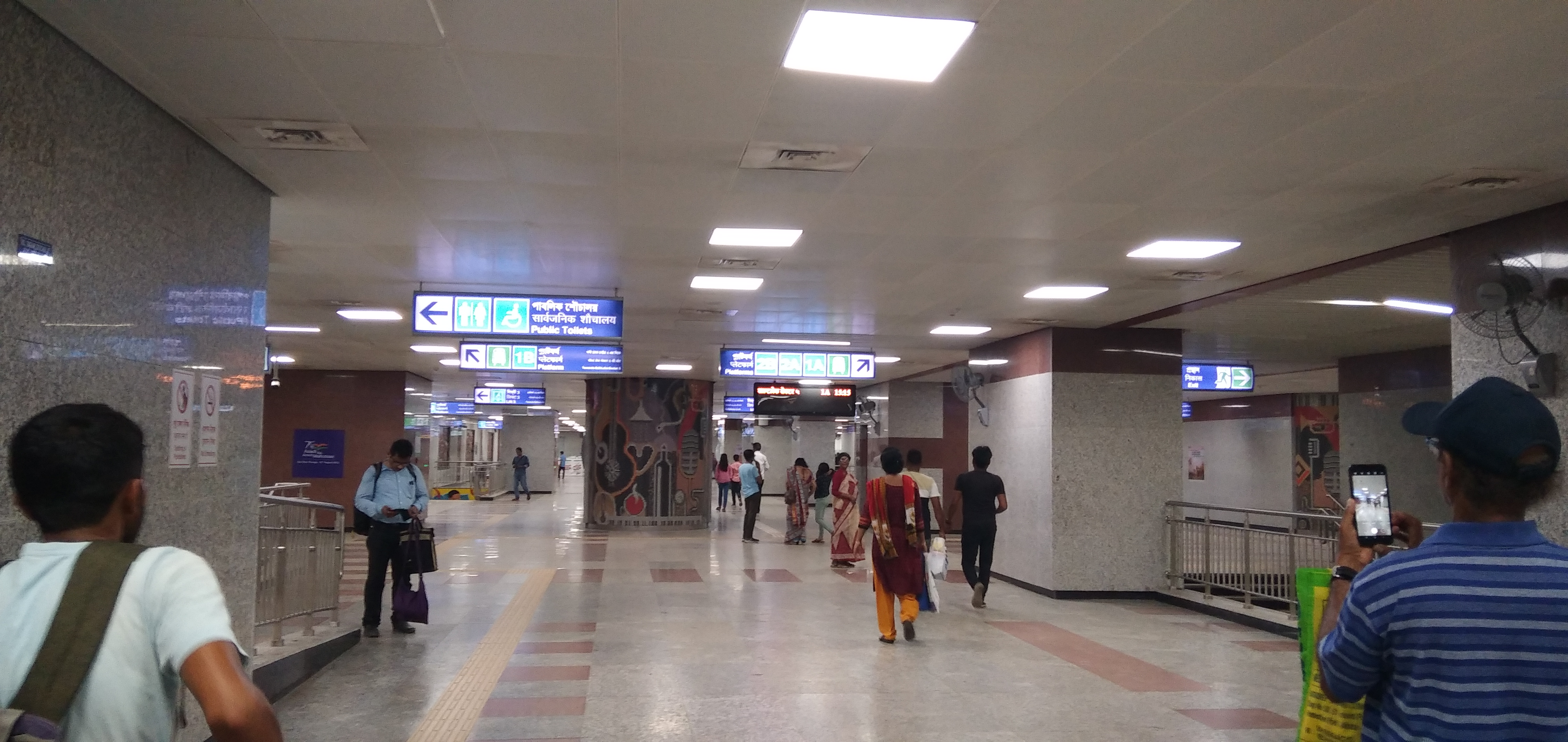

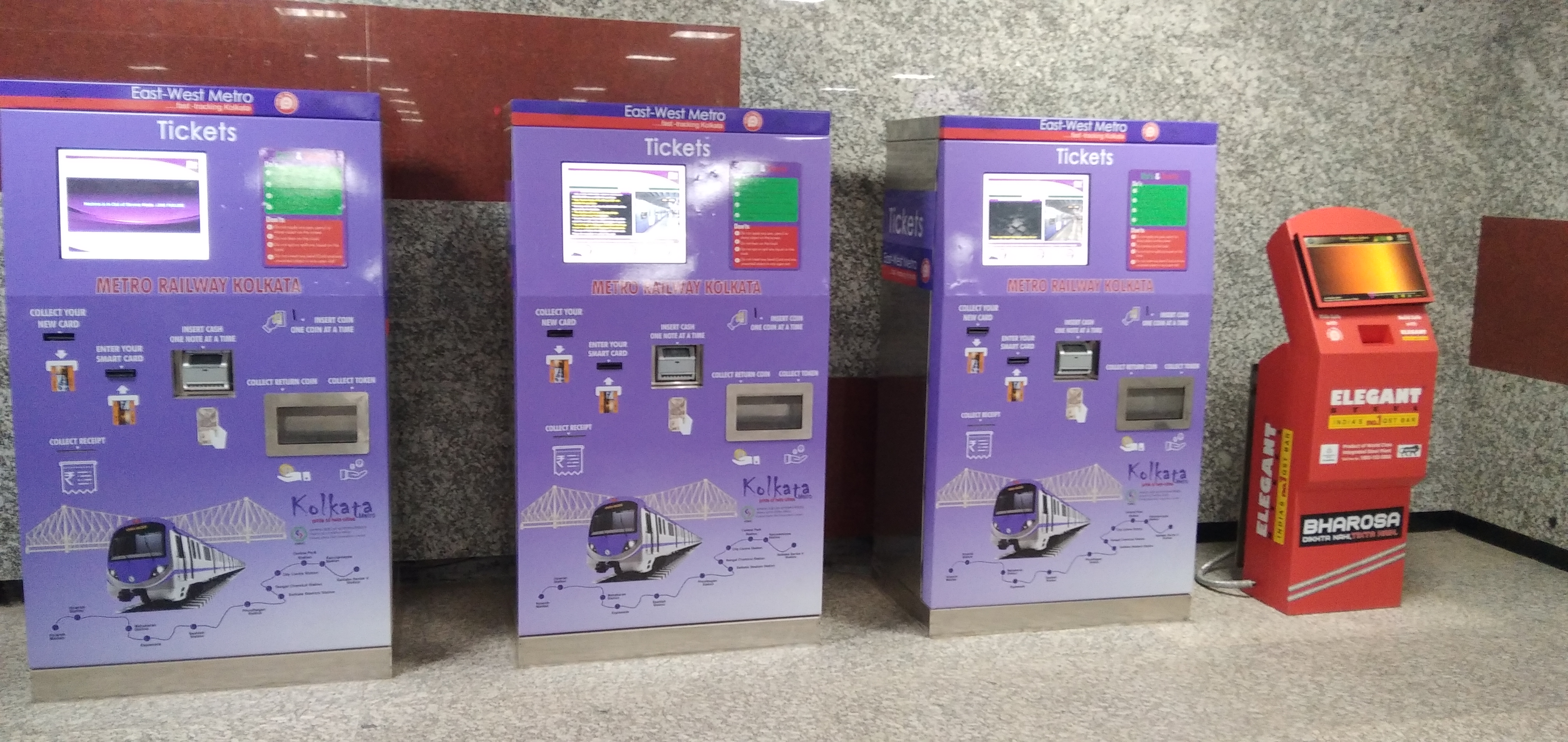

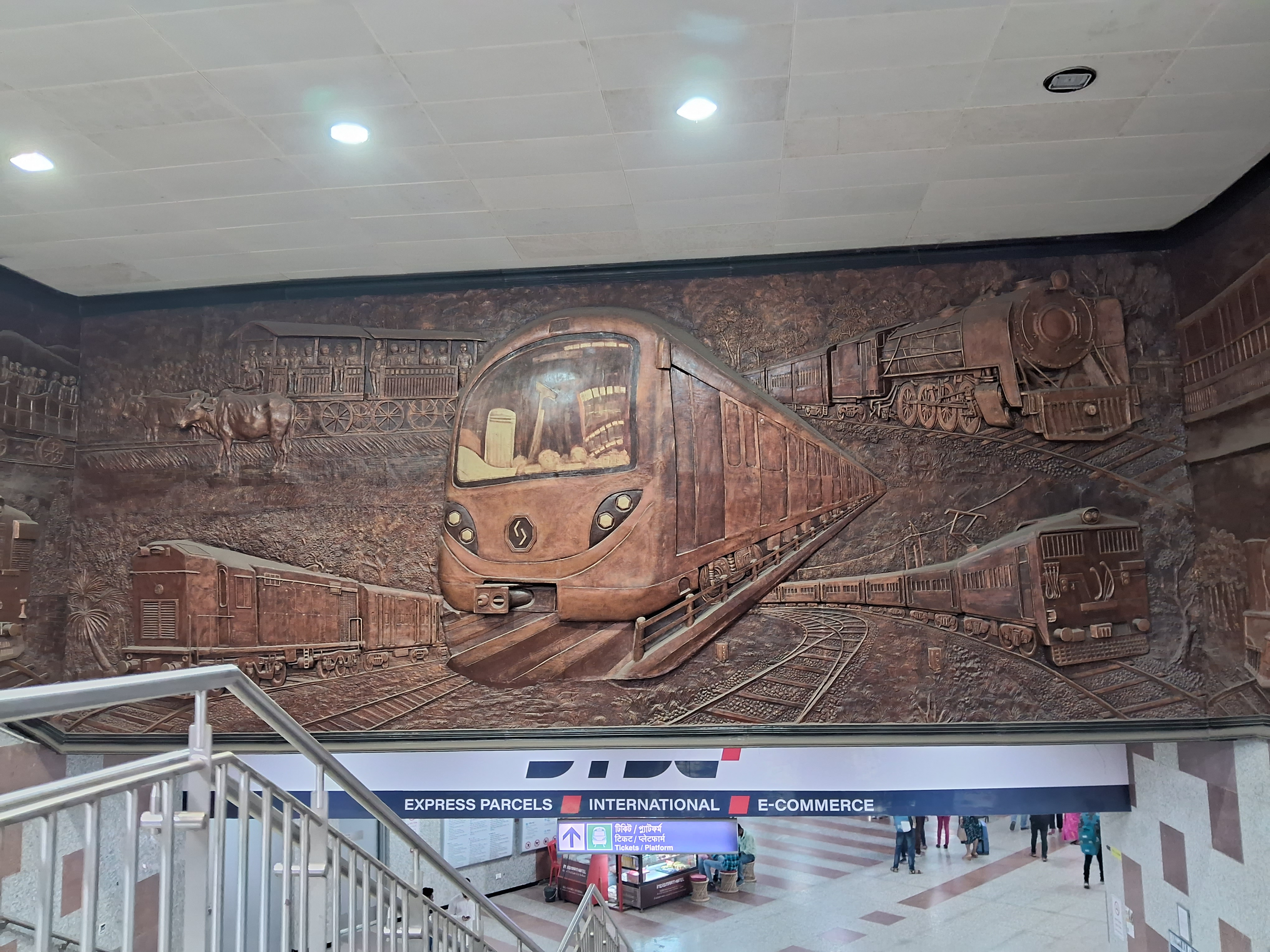

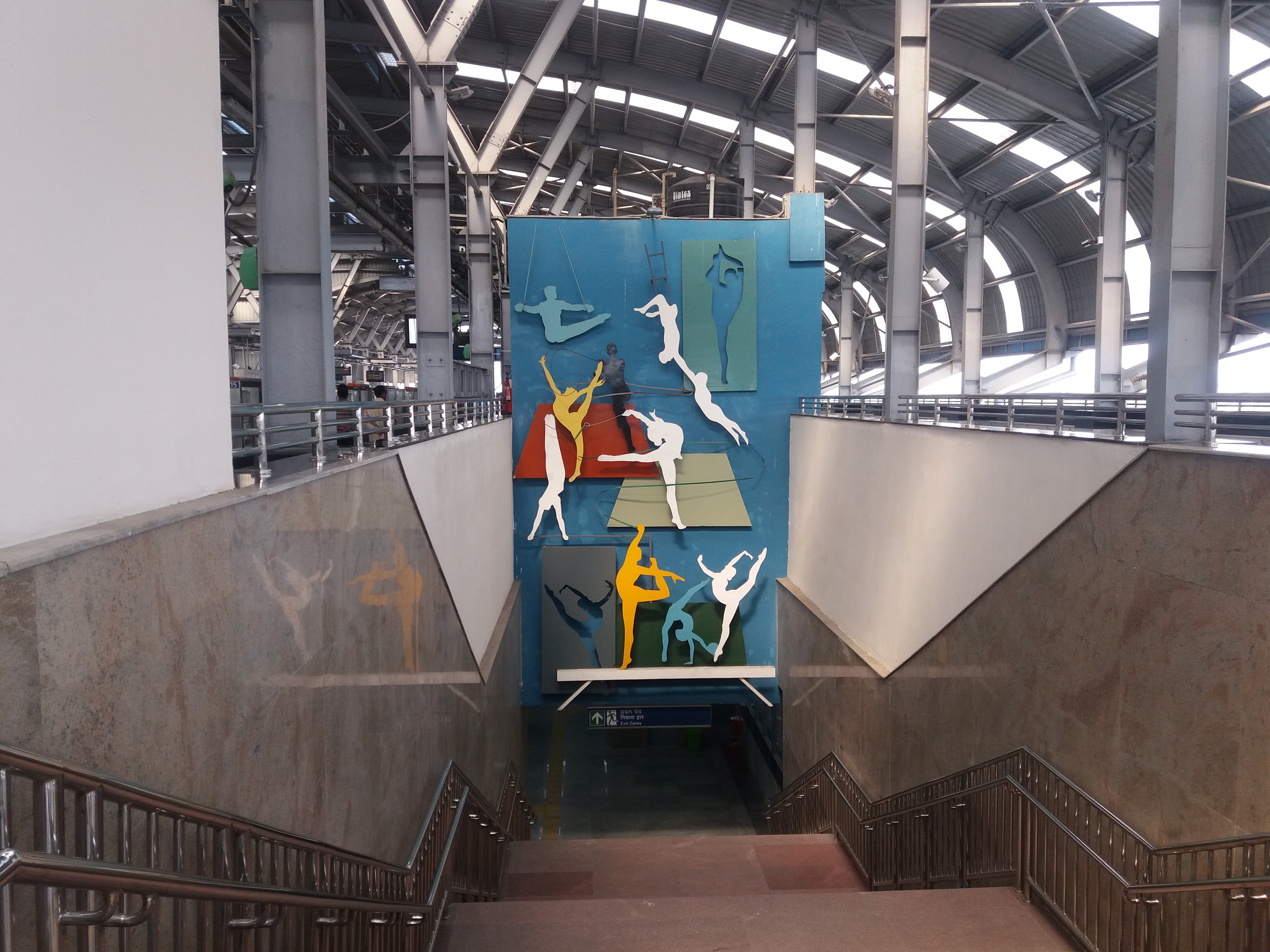

== See also ==
- Kolkata Metro
- List of Kolkata metro stations
- Kolkata Metro Rolling Stock
- List of rapid transit systems
- Trams in Kolkata
- Kolkata Lightrail
- Kolkata Monorail
- Kolkata Suburban Railway
