= Karunamoyee metro station =

Metro station in Bidhannagar, WB, India

Karunamoyee
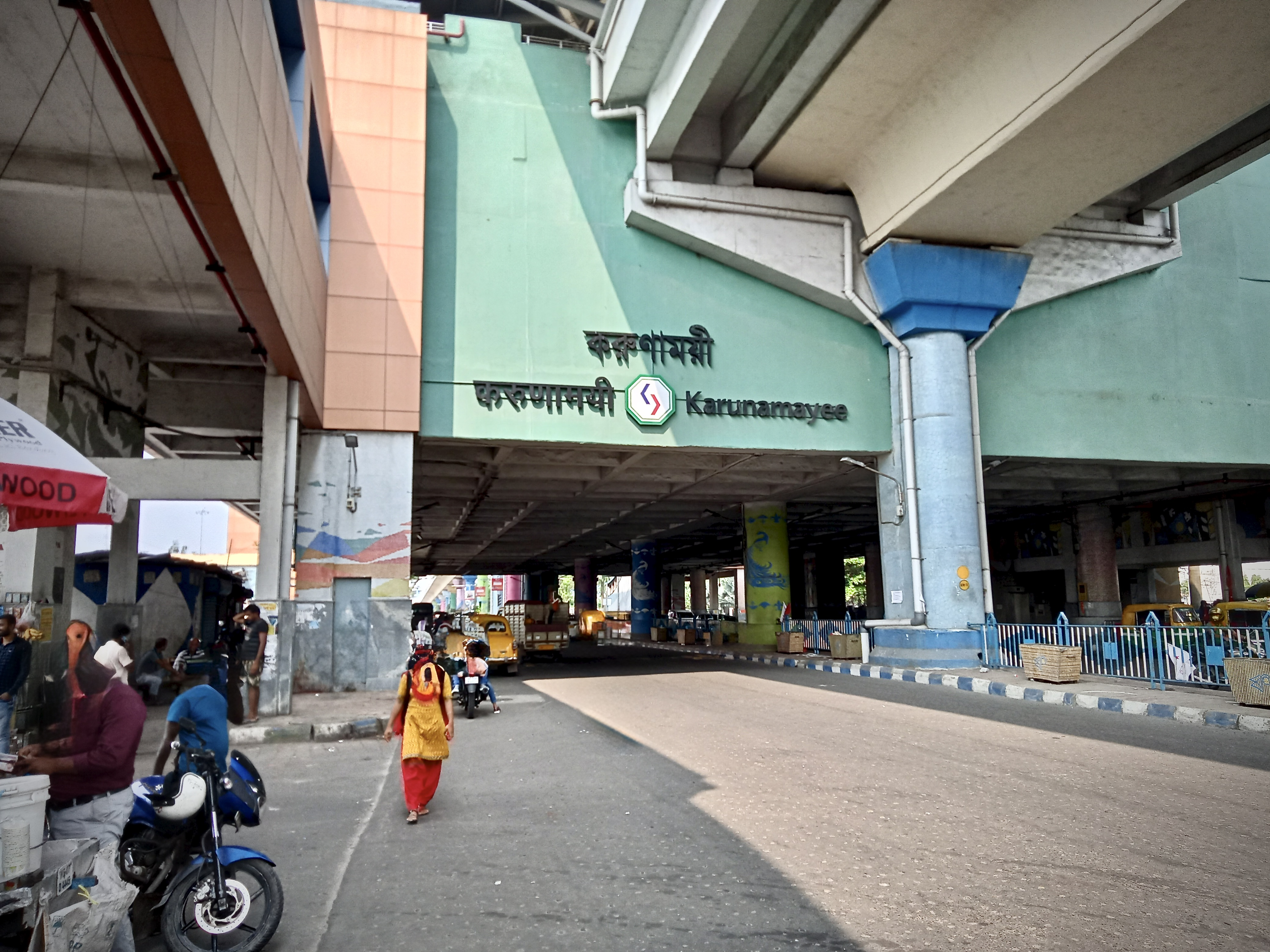

General information
- Other names: Senco Gold & Diamonds Karunamoyee
- Location: DJ Block, 7th Cross Road × 3rd Avenue; Bidhannagar, North 24 Parganas district West Bengal 700091; India
- Coordinates: 22.58638°N 88.42153°E
- System: Kolkata Metro
- Operated by: Metro Railway, Kolkata
- Line: Green Line
- Platforms: 2 (2 side platforms)

Construction
- Structure type: Elevated
- Accessible: Yes

Other information
- Status: Operational
- Station code: KESA

History
- Opening: 13 February 2020; 6 years ago

Services
Preceding station	Kolkata Metro	Following station
Central Park towards Howrah Maidan	Green Line	Salt Lake Sector-V Terminus
Route map
Location

Karunamoyee (also known Senco Gold & Diamonds Karunamoyee for sponsorship reasons) is an elevated metro station on the East-West corridor of the Green Line of Kolkata Metro, serving Kaurnamoyee area of Saltlake City, West Bengal, India. It is located just beside the Karunamoyee bus terminal.

== Station layout ==
L2	Side platform, Doors will open on the left
L2	Platform 1	Train towards Salt Lake Sector-V (terminus) →
L2	Platform 2	← Train towards Howrah Maidan (Central Park)
L2	Side platform, Doors will open on the left
L1	Concourse	Fare control, station agent, Metro QR ticket vending machines, crossover
G	Street level	Exit/Entrance
