= Narkeldanga =

Narkeldanga Narikeldanga
- Neighbourhood in Kolkata (Calcutta)
- Location in Kolkata
- Coordinates: 22.57925°N 88.381013°E
- Country: India
- State: West Bengal
- City: Kolkata
- District: Kolkata
- Metro Station: Phoolbagan
- Municipal Corporation: Kolkata Municipal Corporation
- KMC wards: 29, 30

Population
  - Total: For population see linked KMC ward pages
- Time zone: UTC+5:30 (IST)
- PIN: 700011
- Area code: +91 33
- Lok Sabha constituency: Kolkata Uttar
- Vidhan Sabha constituency: Beleghata

Narkeldanga is a neighbourhood of North Kolkata in Kolkata district in the Indian state of West Bengal.

== History ==
The East India Company obtained from the Mughal emperor Farrukhsiyar, in 1717, the right to rent from 38 villages surrounding their settlement. Of these 5 lay across the Hooghly in what is now Howrah district. The remaining 33 villages were on the Calcutta side. After the fall of Siraj-ud-daulah, the last independent Nawab of Bengal, it purchased these villages in 1758 from Mir Jafar and reorganised them. These villages were known en-bloc as Dihi Panchannagram and Narkeldanga was one of them. It was considered to be a suburb beyond the limits of the Maratha Ditch.

== Geography ==
=== Police district ===
Narkeldanga police station is part of the Eastern Suburban division of Kolkata Police. It is located at 6/1, Dr.M.N.Chatterjee Sarani, Kolkata-700 009.

Ultadanga Women police station covers all police districts under the jurisdiction of the Eastern Suburban division i.e. Beliaghata, Entally, Maniktala, Narkeldanga, Ultadanga, Tangra and Phoolbagan.

== Culture ==
The first Indian attempt, after Gerasim Lebedev’s pioneering efforts, to stage plays in Kolkata was made at Narkeldanga. In 1832, Prasanna Kumar Tagore built a makeshift auditorium in his house in Narkeldanga and staged some English plays. The efforts were followed up by others.

There is a Jewish cemetery at Narkeldanga. The first burial was in 1812. Till 1947, there was a flourishing Jewish community in Kolkata, but in 2015, only 20 were left.

== Transport ==
Narkeldanga Main Road (Maulana Abul Kalam Azad Sarani) passes through the locality. It is connected to Acharya Prafulla Chandra Road at Rajabazar and CIT Road (Hem Chandra Naskar Road) at Phoolbagan.

=== Bus ===
==== Private Bus ====
- 44 Baguiati - Howrah Station
- 235 Salt Lake Karunamoyee - Amtala

==== Mini Bus ====
- S165 Phoolbagan - Howrah Station

=== Train ===
Sir Gurudas Banerjee Halt railway station on Kolkata Circular Railway line serves the locality. Sealdah Station and Bidhannagar Road railway station are also located nearby.
