= Rajabazar, Kolkata =

Rajabazar
- Neighbourhood in Kolkata (Calcutta)
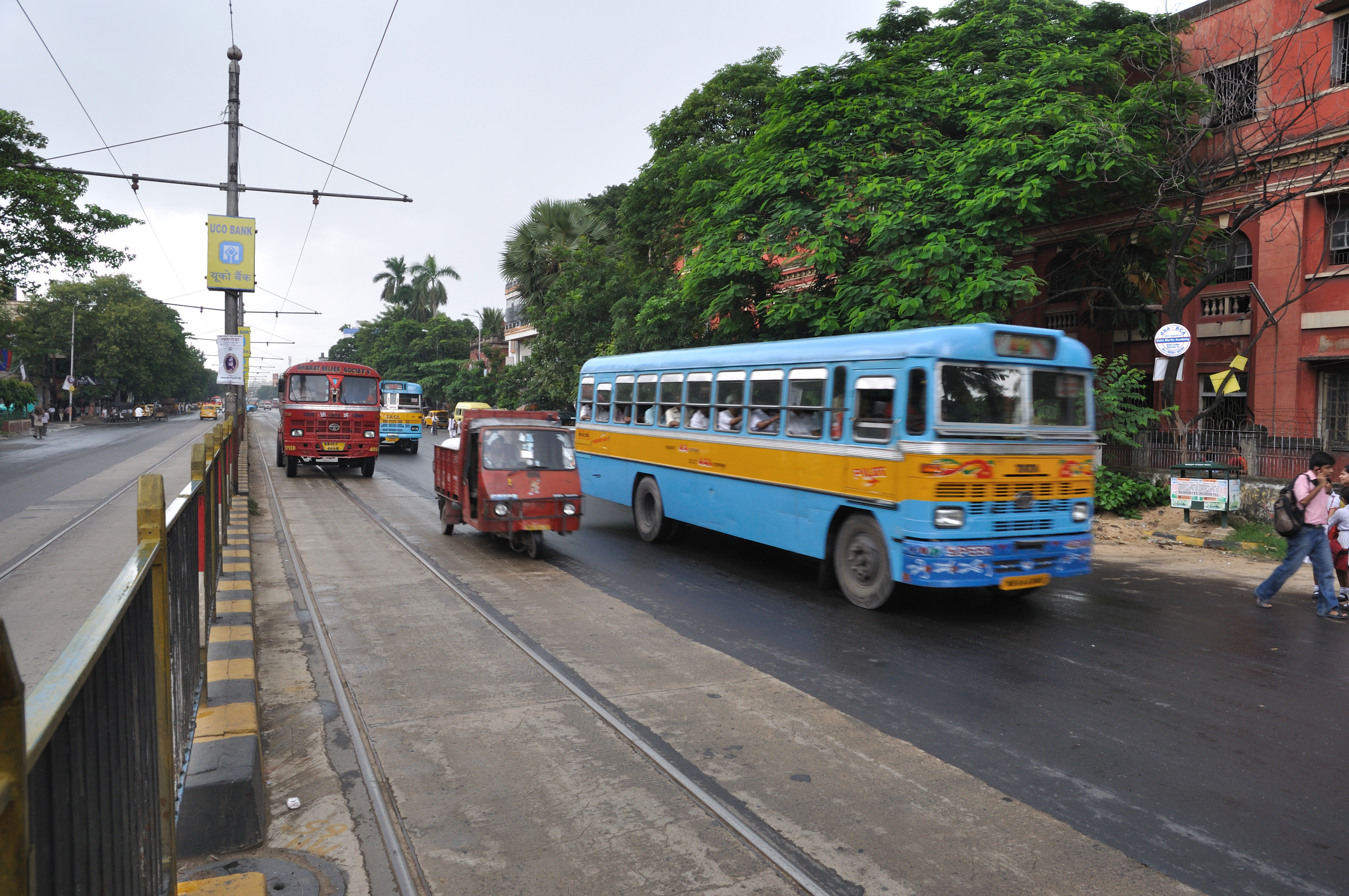
- APC Road, Rajabazar

- Location in Kolkata
- Coordinates: 22.574252°N 88.375013°E
- Country: India
- State: West Bengal
- City: Kolkata
- District: Kolkata
- Metro Station: Sealdah and Phoolbagan
- Municipal Corporation: Kolkata Municipal Corporation
- KMC wards: 28, 36, 37, 38

Population
  - Total: For population see linked KMC ward page
- Time zone: UTC+5:30 (IST)
- PIN: 700009
- Area code: +91 33
- Lok Sabha constituency: Kolkata Uttar
- Vidhan Sabha constituency: Beleghata, Jorasanko

Rajabazar is a locality of Central-North Kolkata in Kolkata district in the Indian state of West Bengal.

== History Raja Ramlochun Ray Kolkata ==
The bazaar was established in about 1842 AD on the land owned by Raja Ramlochun Ray, a small land owner, by Muslim merchants, businessmen, butchers and cattle traders from Bihar and Uttar Pradesh, who had immigrated to Calcutta due to the poor economic condition of Muslims in Bihar and Uttar Pradesh, following the Sepoy Mutiny. However, Rajabazar area was settled by Urdu-speaking Muslims from 1880 onwards. The market-place colony was established around the same time as the Harrison Road (now called MG Road) was being built in Calcutta, connecting Sealdah Station to Howrah Station.

A mosque was built which still exists today known as the Rajabazar Barri Masjid and there is another larger mosque being renovated which is Jama Masjid Darur-Salaam on Narkeldanga Main Road. Several residential quarters were established around that area. A police station (Narkeldanga Police Station) was established in 1915 near the canal, on Canal West road. The area is known as "Khalpul" due to the bridge over the canal that connects Rajabazar to Narkeldanga. Before the building of the bridge in 1910, there was a bamboo-stilt bridge over the canal. Boat ferries were also used to transport people and supplies across the canal. Over the decades, further population growth and immigration resulted in the growth and extension of the original settlement further, up to Narkeldanga and Phoolbagan in the east, Sealdah to the south, Mechua and Kalabagan to the west and further north. Today, the area is densely populated and crowded, with alleys and lanes established. After the riots of 1947 (during the Partition of India), many Muslims from other parts, like Sealdah, Manicktala and Beliaghata moved to Rajabazar.

During the Hindu-Muslim riots in Calcutta in 1964, Mr. Skaikh Mahmood helped Muslims living in areas like Maniktala, Sealdah, Beliaghata and throughout Calcutta, flock to Rajabazar. Over time, it got transformed into a ghetto. After the 1992-93 Hindu-Muslim riots in Calcutta, more Muslims moved to Rajabazar, as a result of which, today, Rajabazar boasts of having the second largest Muslim population in Calcutta after Metiabruz.

There is a shrine (mazaar) of a Muslim Sufi saint in Rajabazar. The area spans the canal, and crosses over the bridge. There are 9 Mosques located at Rajabazar. The bazaar is famous for its jewellery, bangles, kites, sweetmeats and mutton and beef shops. Rajabazaar is a major cattle and goat trading center in West Bengal called Bakrichar. A movie hall, "Tasveer Mahal", is also located at Rajabazar.

== Demographics ==
Majority of the population of Rajabazar is Sunni Muslim, mostly Urdu-speaking, descended from immigrants from Bihar and Uttar Pradesh. Mostly Deobandi theology is practised here, and Bareilvi theology population also co-exists peacefully. There are also many shia families. Many Hindus also live at Rajabazaar. Most of the population is middle-class and lower-middle class, but many rich, educated Muslims also live here in high-rises. More or less there are a total of 12 mosques in the area, 9 managed by the Tablighi Jamaat (Deobandi), 2 mosques are managed by the Sunni Bareilvi sect and 1 mosque is managed by Ahle Hadees Ahle Sunnat wal jammat.

== Amenities and transport ==
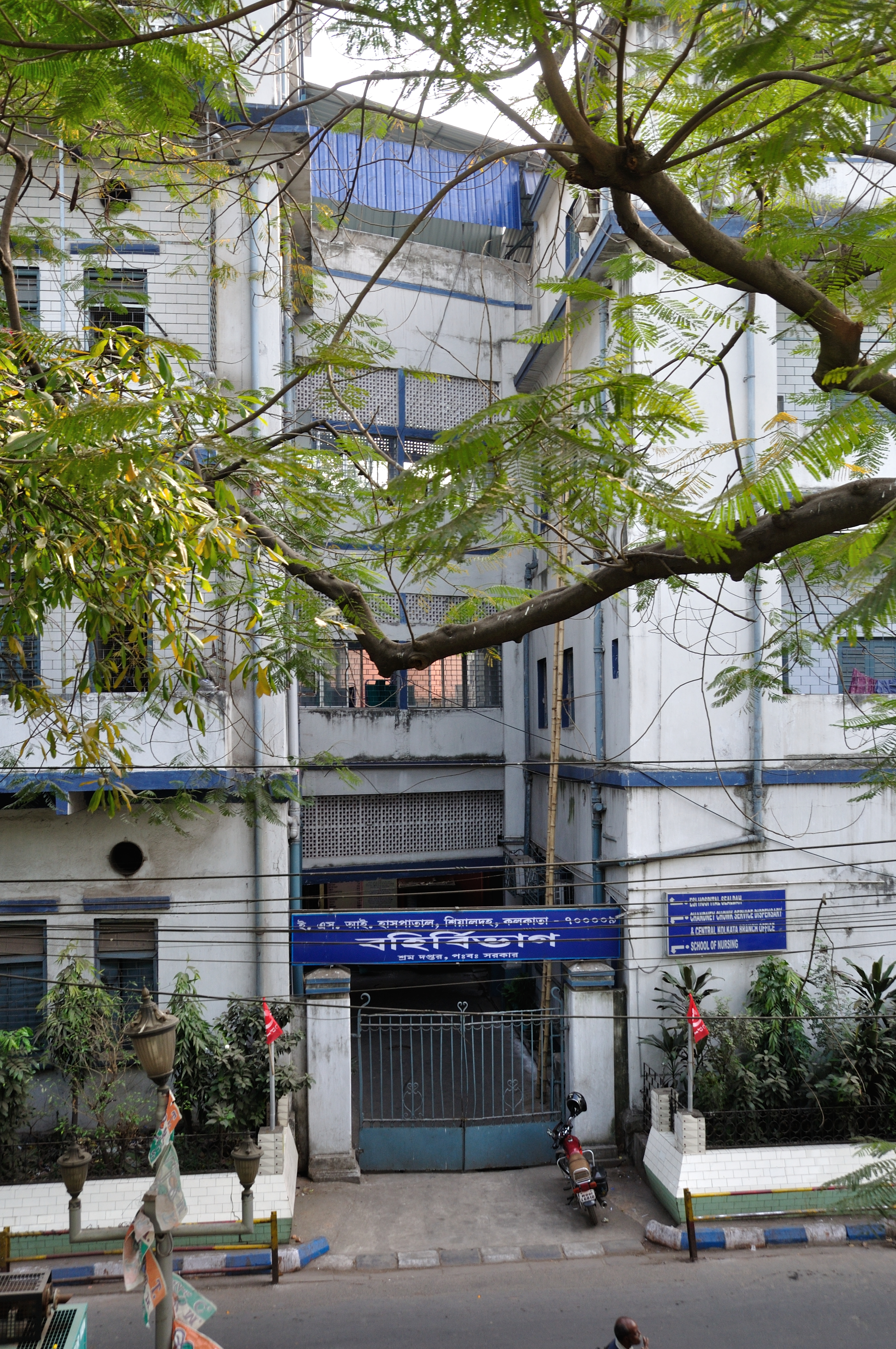
Sealdah ESI Hospital, near Rajabazar

B.C. Roy Memorial Hospital and Sealdah ESI Hospital are located at a stone's throw distance from Rajabazar and Calcutta Medical College and Hospital is located just 5 km away, on College Street. Narkeldanga Police Station is located right in the heart and center of Rajabazar. Acharya Prafulla Chandra Road is the artery of Rajabazar. Surya Sen Street and Narkeldanga Main Road (Maulana Abul Kalam Azad Sarani) are also connected to APC Road in Rajabazar. Sealdah Railway Station and Rajabazar CTC (WBTC) Depot provide ample transport opportunities.

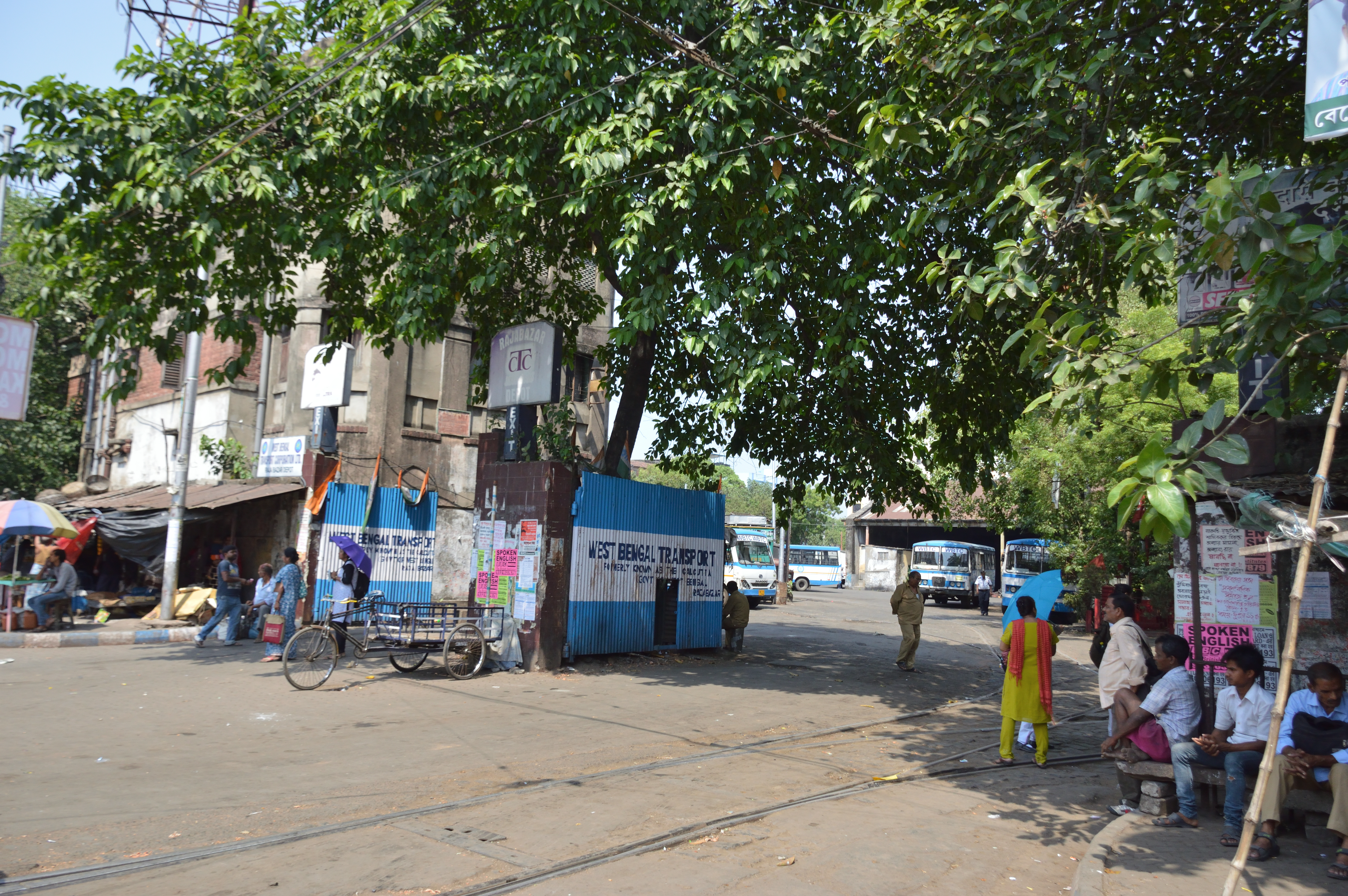
CTC (WBTC) Depot, Rajabazar

WBTC buses C11, S3B, T8, EB1A; Private buses 3C/1, 3D, 3D/1, 12C/2, 30B, 30C/1, 30D, 34C, 44, 44A, 46B, 47/1, 79D, 202, 206, 217, 227, 230, 234, 235, KB17, KB21, K4; few minibuses and Kolkata tram route no. 18 ply by Rajabazar. WBTC buses C24, MIDI1, S3A, T10; Private buses 12, 12/1, 13, 21, 21/1, 71 and Malipanchghara-Rajabazar minibus start from Rajabazar CTC (WBTC) Depot. Private buses 204/1, 213A, K6 and Ranihati-Rajabazar minibus, Fatikgachi-Rajabazar minibus, Behala-Rajabazar minibus, Thakurpukur-Rajabazar minibus start from Rajabazar Science College. The Mechua-Kadapara auto route plies through Rajabazar. Kolkata Metro Green Line passes through Sealdah and Phoolbagan, which are very near to Rajabazar.

For a long time Rajabazar was notorious as being one of the worst areas in Kolkata in terms of sanitation, cleanliness and amenities. However, from the late 1990s onwards, the pace has been slowly picked up on development, mainly through the efforts of local leaders.

== Business ==
Small Scale Industry like Punching, Offset printing, Card Board Box, multi store and restaurant Making are common in this area. One of the biggest Paper Market of Asia is also located here by the name of Patwar Bagan.

== Kolkata Municipal Corporation ==
The area of Rajabazar is composed of Wards 28, 36, 37 and 38 of the Kolkata Municipal Corporation. These wards were created in 1909. Presently, the KMC maintains health centres and free malaria check-up centres in these wards. The elected Councillor of Ward 28 is Mr Md iqbal (Trinamool Congress). Mr. Prakash Upadhyay & Mousumi Ghosh are also popular Councillors. Somendra Nath Mitra (Somen Mitra) and Dr Subhodh Kr De are the veteran politicians of this area.

Rajabazar is part of Jorasanko (Vidhan Sabha constituency) and Beliaghata (Vidhan Sabha constituency). It is a part of the Kolkata Uttar (Lok Sabha constituency). Previously it was a part of Calcutta North East (Lok Sabha constituency).

== Education ==
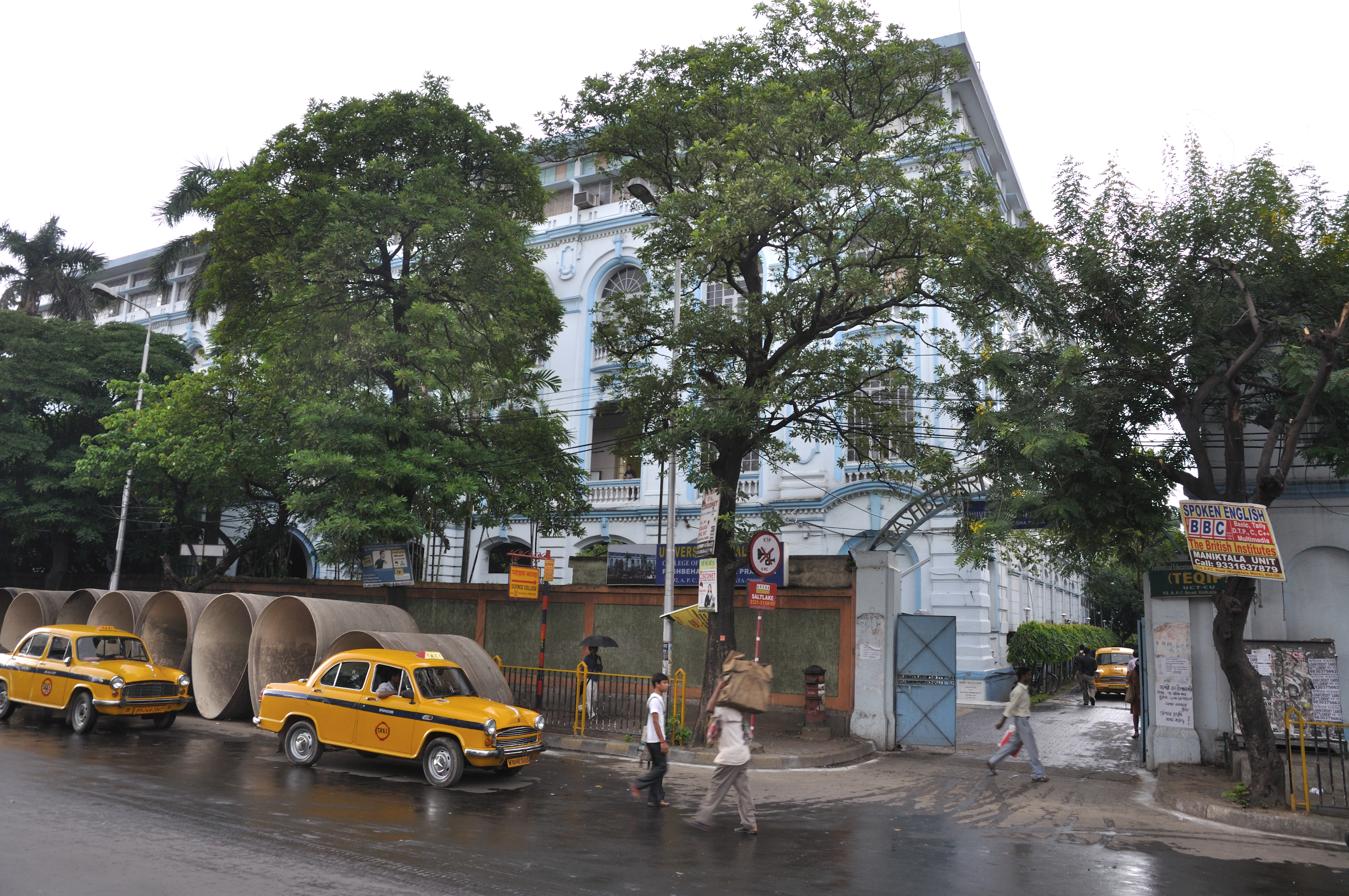
Science College (Rashbehari Siksha Prangan)

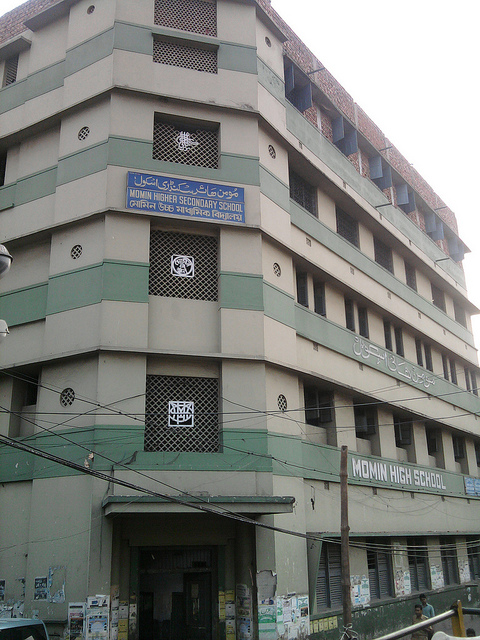
Momin High School

- University College of Science, Technology and Agriculture, a university campus of science and technology under Calcutta University.
- "Azad National Day & Night School" in ward no 36 started as a private scholl but was later transferred to the government.
- Momin High School, a Government-aided co-educational Urdu-medium school affiliated to the West Bengal Board of Higher Secondary Education. It was founded in 1945 by the Momin Education Board.
- Baitulmal Girls High School, is a well stablished girls school.
- Rajabazar Boys & Girls' School, a co-educational English-medium school for minority and low earning peoples this land space was under Mr Shaik Mahmood he donated and Hindustan health club's all tools instruments to grow the school in early 1970 he expired 1976.
- TAKI High School.
