= Kolkata Improvement Trust =

Former urban development agency of Kolkata, India

- কলকাতা উন্নয়ন সংস্থা
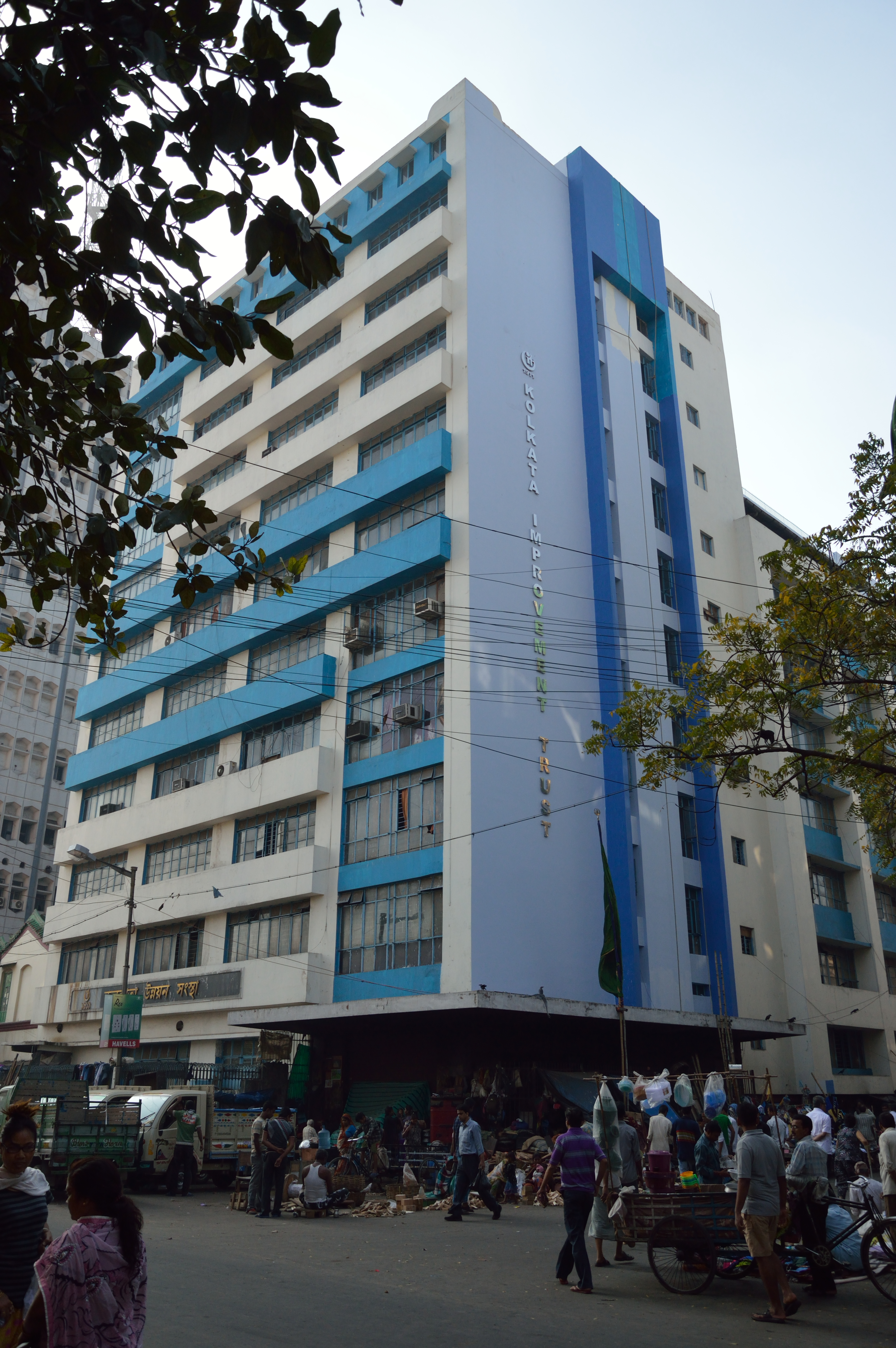
- KIT Building at India Exchange Place, Kolkata

Agency overview
- Formed: 1911
- Jurisdiction: Government of West Bengal
- Website: https://www.wburbandev.gov.in/Home/attached_office_kit

The Kolkata Improvement Trust, initially known as the Calcutta Improvement Trust or simply the C.I.T., was a statutory body under the Urban Development and Municipal Affairs Department of the Government of West Bengal. It was the oldest urban development agency of Kolkata and made significant impact on the city's urban geography and pattern of urban growth. It was merged with the larger Kolkata Metropolitan Development Authority in 2017 to increase efficiency and cut costs.

== History ==
The Calcutta Improvement Trust was set up in 1911 through the Kolkata Improvement Act, 1911. Following a recommendation from a government appointed commission and public opinion, the trust was created with the purpose of expansion and improvement of Kolkata and its urban surroundings.

A brainchild of George Lord Curzon when he served as the Governor-General of India, it was created as a reaction to the growing representation of native Indians in the existing Calcutta Municipal Corporation(CMC). Development of urban infrastructure through the maintenance and building of lakes, housing, area development, road alignments, rehabilitation projects and commercial complexes was part of the initial program. This also included the preparation of land bank.

=== Urban Renewal ===
The areas earmarked for growth included localities on the fringes of the city back then such Tollygunge, Kankurgachi, Phoolbagan, Ultadanga, and the Paddapukur locality in Bhawanipore, as well as those well entrenched within the city boundaries such as Maniktala, Entally, Burrabazar, Cossipore, and Paikpara near Chitpur.

The Trust engaged the services of Georges-Eugène Haussmann, the town planner who had successfully restructured the city of Paris. Haussmann believed in Euclidean layouts, comprising straight avenues intersecting each other at right angles. This necessitated ploughing through already built-up areas. His other favoured concepts included 'circulation' (i.e. constructing roads for the movement of people and goods) and 'respiration' (leaving open spaces for the city to breathe).

The resulting confection of parks, wide boulevards and so on entailed the destruction of considerable amounts of built up areas. This continued from its early days, through the decades of the colonial period and even after the partition in 1947.

In May 2011, The Municipal and Urban Development Minister of Bengal announced that the KIT would be merged with the KMC.

=== Merger with KMDA ===
In 2017, the state government merged the century-old KIT and the Kolkata Metropolitan Water and Sanitation Authority (KMWSA) with the Kolkata Metropolitan Development Authority(KMDA). This was done by passing the West Bengal Town and Country (Planning and Development) Bill, 2017 by Firhad Hakim, state Urban Development and Municipal Affairs minister.

As a result, the Kolkata Improvement Trust Act, 1911 and Kolkata Metropolitan Water and Sanitation Act, 1966 were repealed. Hakim had alleged the two organisations had been merged for efficient management and execution and bring them under one umbrella.

"CPI(M) used to sell land of KMDA at throwaway prices and the KIT had virtually become defunct." Hakim had said in the assembly. There are 419 staffs and 200 engineers in KIT but they do not practically have any work. They used to come to office, gossip for the whole day and got the salary at the end of the month. The Bill will reduce overhead expenditure," he maintained.

== Major projects ==
Some of its recent projects in recent years include: A commercial Complex at Bosepukur, in Kasba as well as the construction of the Kolkata Metropolitan Library Building at Ballygunge Park Road.

At the time of merger with KMDA, among the proposed activities on a Public-Private Partnership Model were the completion of a link road adjoining Subhash Sarobar, extension of the development of Rabindra Sarobar, Subhas Sarobar, residential-cum-commercial complex at Bow Street, taking up renovation of BRS-II at Dum Dum Road and encroached KIT land along Ultadanga Railway Line. Projects such as the construction of road and overbridge connecting Beliaghata Main Road and Kolkata Railway Passengers Terminal under the central Jawaharlal Nehru National Urban Renewal Mission scheme was also on the cards.
