= Sir Gurudas Banerjee Halt railway station =

Railway station in West Bengal, India

Sir Gurudas Banerjee Halt

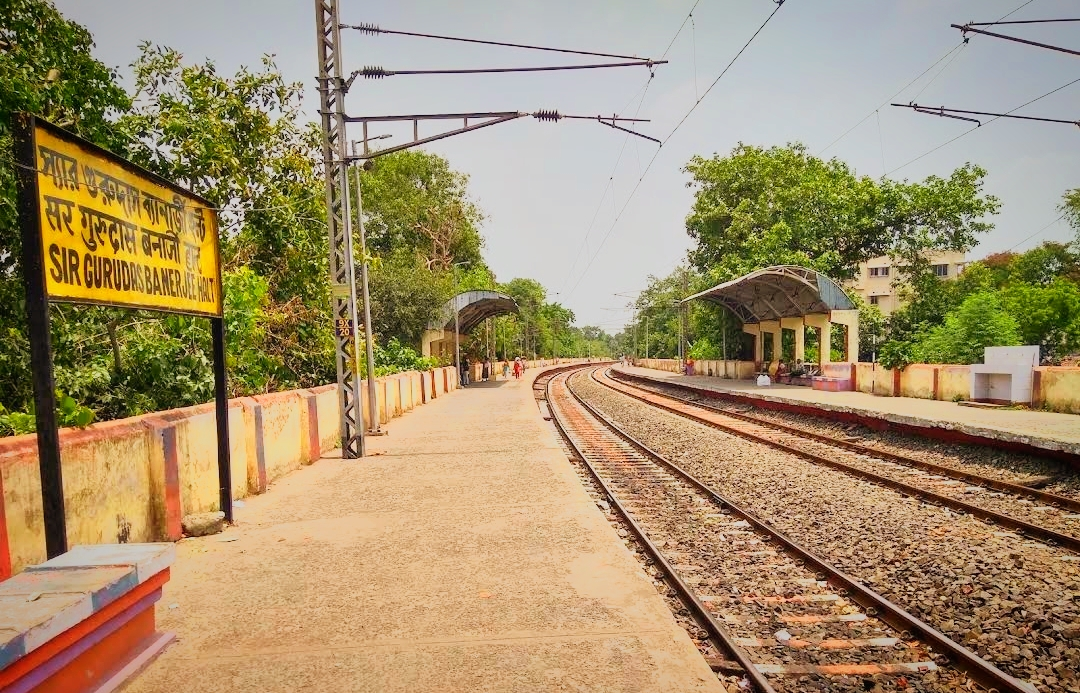

General information
- Location: Narkeldanga, Kolkata, West Bengal; India
- Coordinates: 22.574171°N 88.385046°E
- Elevation: 5 metres (16 ft)
- System: Kolkata Suburban Railway station
- Owner: Indian Railways
- Operator: Eastern Railway
- Platforms: 2
- Tracks: 2
- Connections: Phoolbagan

Construction
- Structure type: At grade
- Parking: Not available
- Cycle facilities: Not available
- Accessible: Not available

Other information
- Status: Functioning
- Station code: SGBA
- Zone(s): Eastern Railway
- Division(s): Sealdah

History
- Opened: 1995; 31 years ago
- Electrified: 1995; 31 years ago
Services
Preceding station	Kolkata Suburban Railway	Following station
Park Circus towards Dum Dum Junction	Circular Line	Bidhannagar Road towards Dum Dum Junction
Route map
Location

Sir Gurudas Banerjee Halt railway station is a Kolkata Suburban Railway station in Narkeldanga, Kolkata. It serves the local areas of Narkeldanga and Phoolbagan in Kolkata, West Bengal, India. A few trains run through this station and halt here. The station has two platforms. Its code is SGBA.

== Station complex ==
Earlier on, the platform was not well sheltered. The station lacked many public facilities including water and sanitation.

However, in 2017, there have been many improvements to this station, wherein shelters and seats were added for passengers, water dispensers were placed, and floodlights have been positioned to ensure safety at night. The platform too, was considerably elongated to accommodate longer trains.

In the recent past, there has also been a surge in the number of passengers utilizing the station.

== Connections ==
=== Auto ===
Phoolbagan to Sealdah auto route connects the station to Sealdah railway station.

=== Bus ===
Bus route number 12C/2, 44, 45, 217B, 221, 223, 235, 253, DN17, S122 (Mini), S138 (Mini), S165 (Mini), S173 (Mini), AC49A, D11A serve the station.

=== Metro ===
Phoolbagan of Green Line is within 500m.
