= Phoolbagan =

- Neighbourhood in Kolkata (Calcutta)
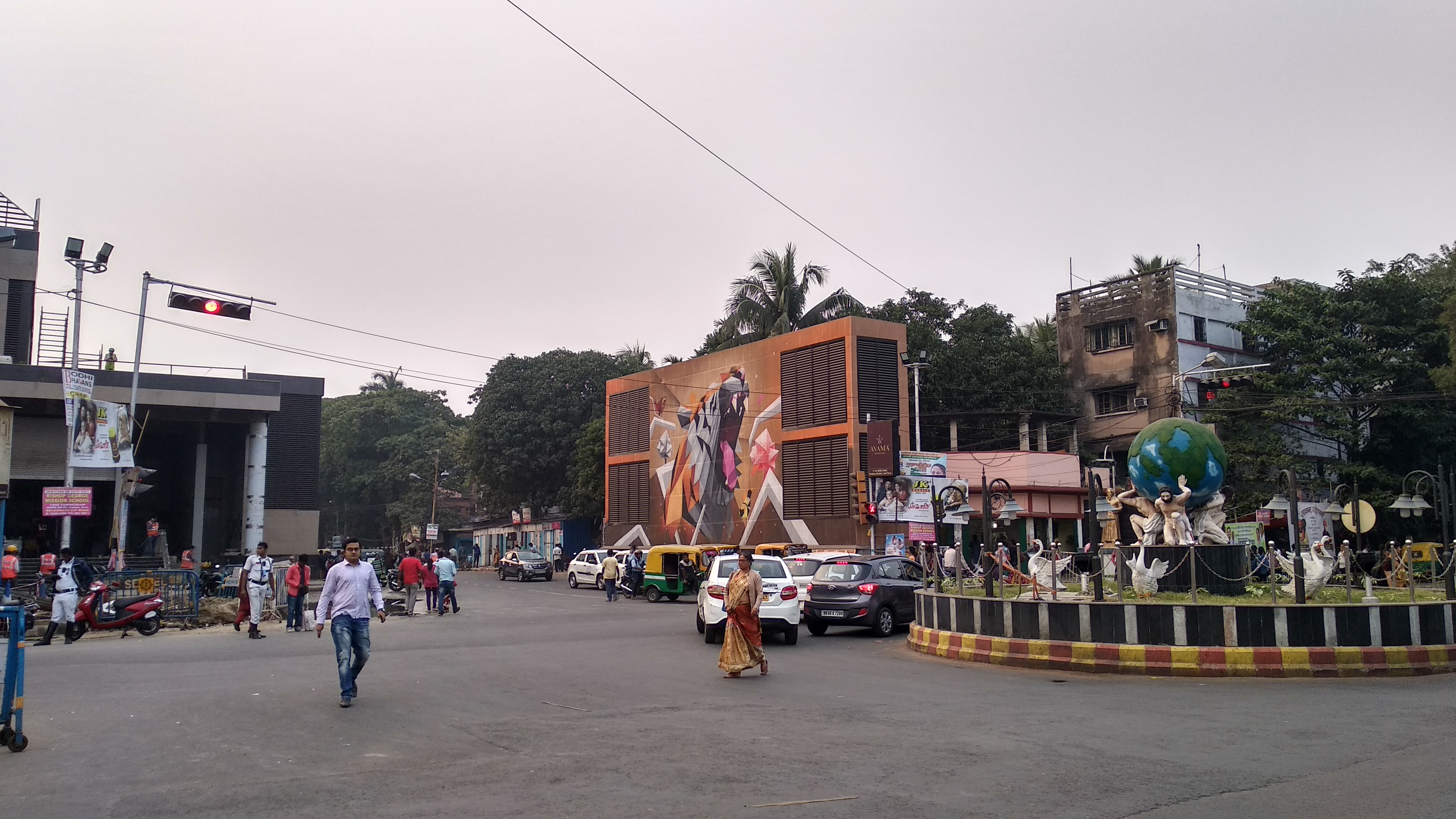

- Location in Kolkata
- Coordinates: 22.57125°N 88.396813°E
- Country: India
- State: West Bengal
- City: Kolkata
- District: Kolkata
- Municipal Corporation: Kolkata Municipal Corporation
- KMC wards: 30, 31, 33, 35

Population
  - Total: For population see linked KMC ward pages
- Time zone: UTC+5:30 (IST)
- PIN: 700010, 700054, 700085
- Area code: +91 33
- Lok Sabha constituency: Kolkata Uttar
- Vidhan Sabha constituency: Beleghata
- Kolkata Metro station: Phoolbagan

Phoolbagan is a locality of North Kolkata in Kolkata district in the Indian state of West Bengal. Subhas Sarovar, one of the famous tourist attractions in Kolkata is located at Phoolbagan.

== Geography ==
=== Police district ===
Phoolbagan police station is part of the Eastern Suburban division of Kolkata Police. It is located at P-86, CIT Road, Scheme VIIM, Kolkata-700 054.

Ultadanga Women police station covers all police districts under the jurisdiction of the Eastern Suburban division i.e. Beliaghata, Entally, Maniktala, Narkeldanga, Ultadanga, Tangra and Phoolbagan.

== Transport ==
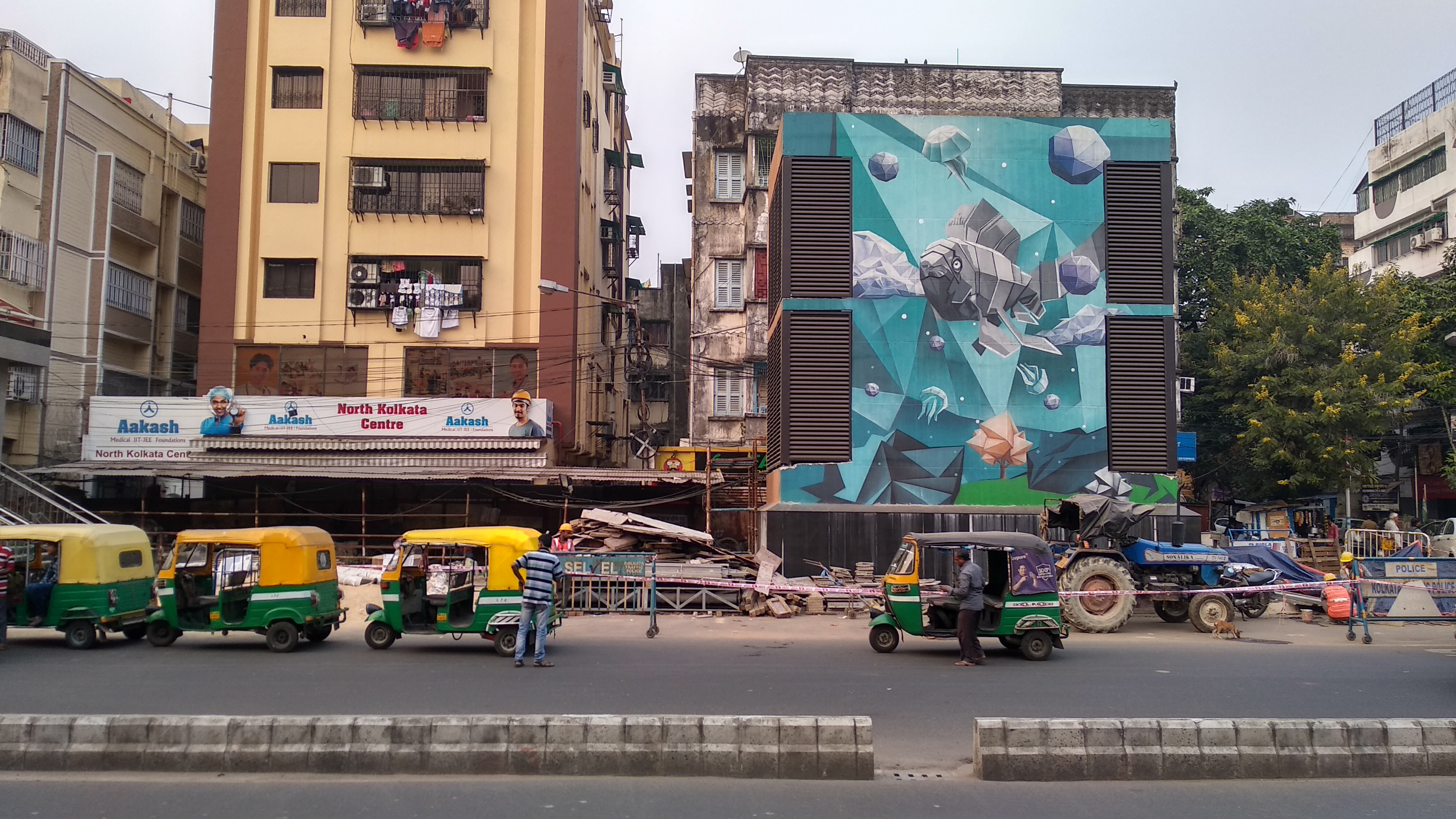
Phoolbagan metro station

Phoolbagan is the junction of CIT Road (Hem Chandra Naskar Road) and Narkeldanga Main Road (Maulana Abul Kalam Azad Sarani). EM Bypass passes along the eastern boundary of Phoolbagan. Many buses ply along these roads. ‘CIT Roads’ created by CIT through congested areas in the 1930s, developed such neighbourhoods as Beliaghata, Tiljala, Kankurgachi and Phoolbagan in eastern Kolkata.

== Transportations ==
Sealdah Station, Sir Gurudas Banerjee Halt railway station, Bidhannagar Road railway station and Phoolbagan metro station (Green Line) are located near Phoolbagan.
