= Kankurgachi =

- Neighbourhood in Kolkata (Calcutta)
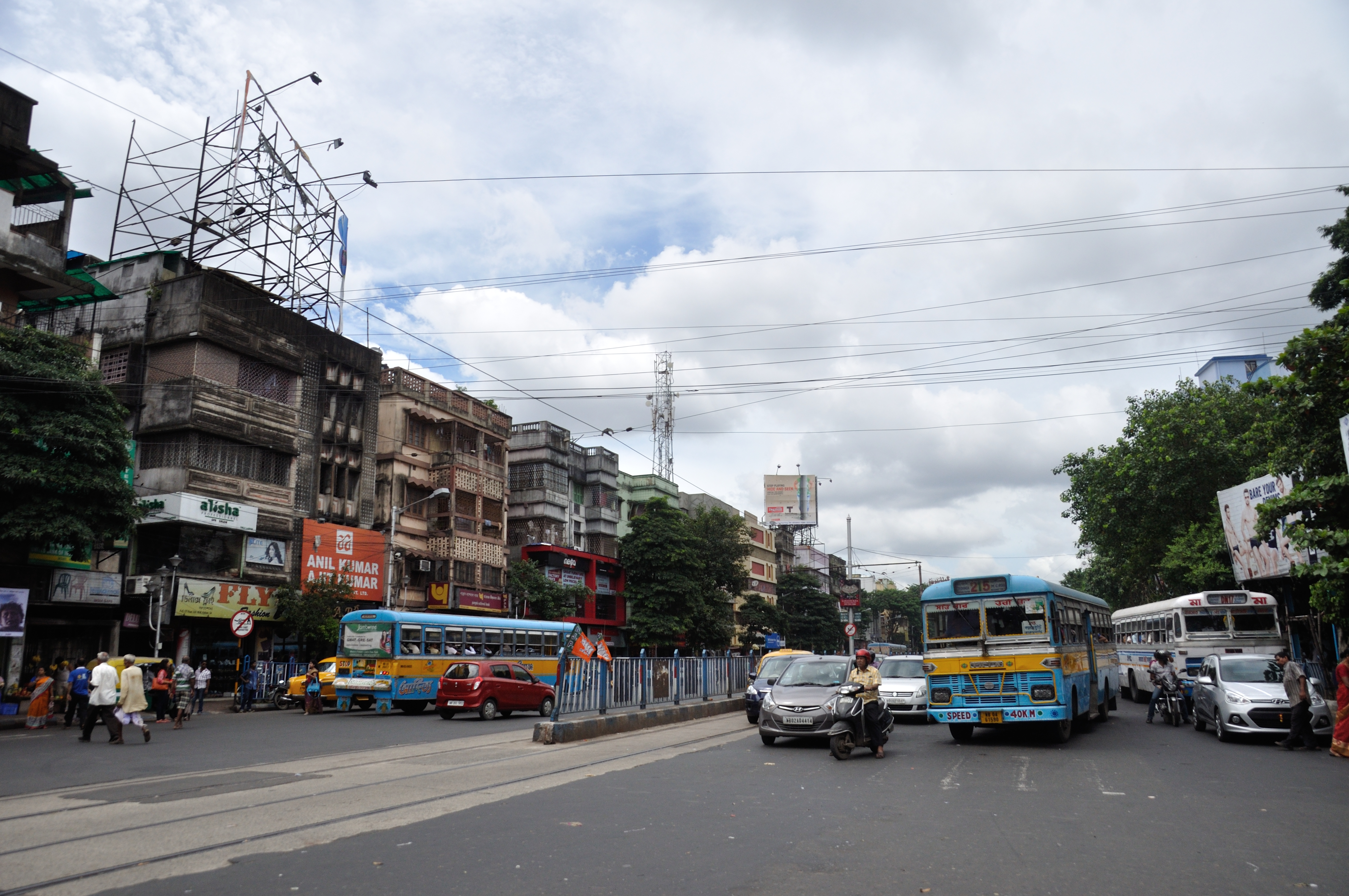
- CIT Road, Kankurgachi

- Location in Kolkata
- Coordinates: 22.57625°N 88.387528°E
- Country: India
- State: West Bengal
- City: Kolkata
- District: Kolkata
- Metro Station: Phoolbagan; Bengal Chemical; Salt Lake Stadium
- Municipal Corporation: Kolkata Municipal Corporation
- KMC wards: 30, 31, 32
- Elevation: 36 ft (11 m)
- Time zone: UTC+5:30 (IST)
- PIN: 700054
- Area code: +91 33
- Lok Sabha constituency: Kolkata Uttar
- Vidhan Sabha constituency: Beleghata and Maniktala

Kankurgachi is a locality of North Kolkata in Kolkata district in the Indian state of West Bengal. It is one of the important junctions in North Kolkata. This is one of the most posh area amongst all the areas of North Kolkata, consisting high rise, and costly apartments.

== Etymology ==
It was an area which was reclaimed early from the Salt Lakes. Kankur, a species of melon, grew well in the area.

== History ==
The East India Company obtained from the Mughal emperor Farrukhsiyar, in 1717, the right to rent from 38 villages surrounding their settlement. Of these 5 lay across the Hooghly in what is now Howrah district. The remaining 33 villages were on the Calcutta side. After the fall of Siraj-ud-daulah, the last independent Nawab of Bengal, it purchased these villages in 1758 from Mir Jafar and reorganised them. These villages were known en-bloc as Dihi Panchannagram and Kankurgachi was one of them. It was considered to be a suburb beyond the limits of the Maratha Ditch.

Kankurgachi was developed by the Kolkata Improvement Trust (formerly Calcutta Improvement Trust). Kankurgachi township began in the 60s along with Salt Lake. Earlier it was planned to provide residential houses only to doctors and lawyers, but eventually this place developed into a cosmopolitan neighbourhood.

== Transport ==
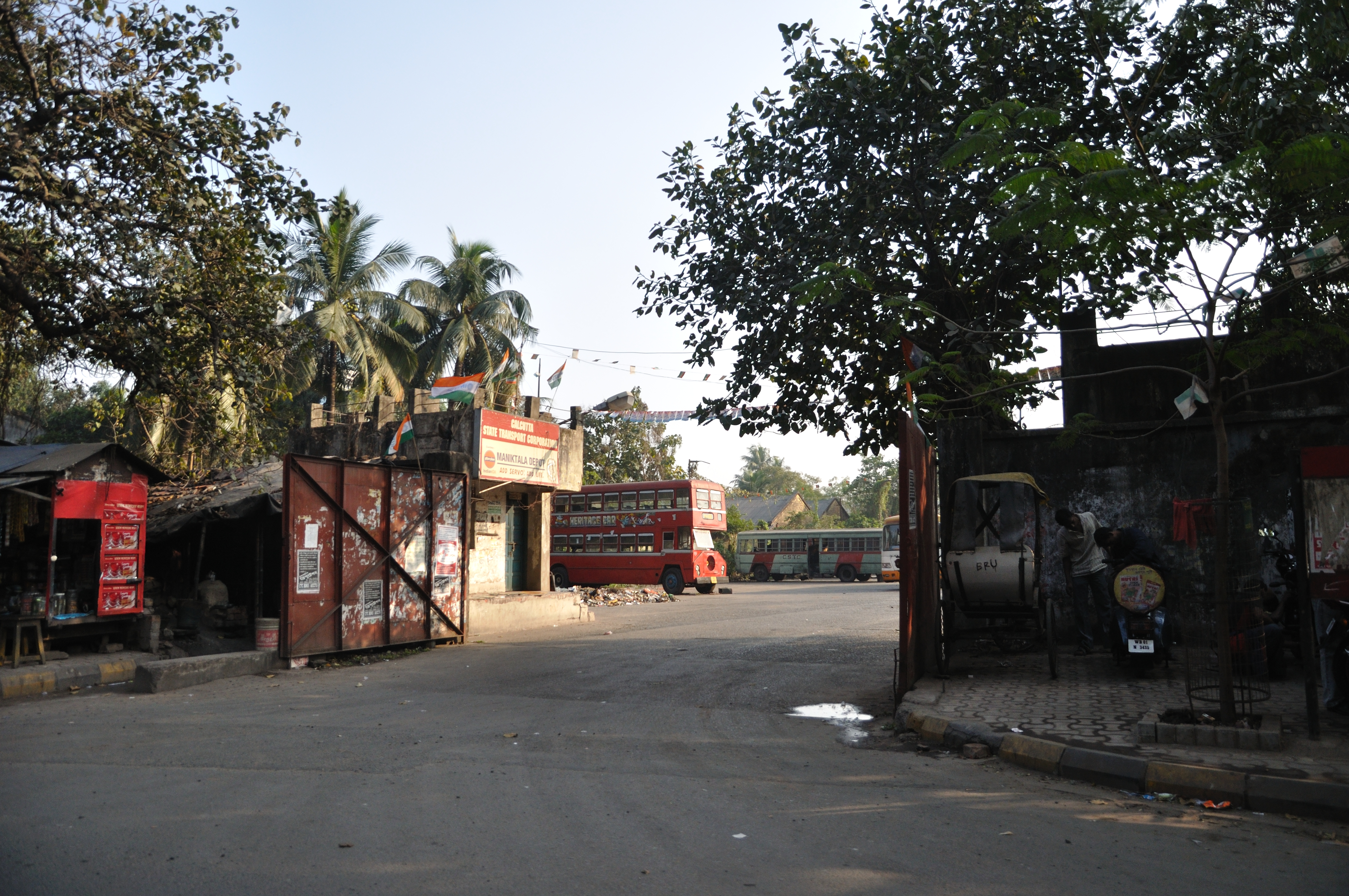
WBTC Maniktala Depot, Kankurgachi

=== WBTC Bus ===
- AC-39 (Airport - Howrah Stn)
- AC-30 (Lake Town - Howrah Stn)
- AC-2 (Barasat - Howrah Stn)
- EB-13 (Hatisala - Howrah Stn)
- VS-2 (Airport - Howrah Stn)
- VS-1 (Airport - Esplanade)
- S-3B (Behala - Kankurgachi)
- S-21 (Baghbazar - Garia)
- S-16 (Joka - Karunamoyee)

Kankurgachi is the junction of Maniktala Main Road and CIT Road. EM Bypass passes along the eastern boundary of Kankurgachi. The area is well connected with other parts of the city by extremely convenient bus and auto routes. Buses from almost every location in and around Kolkata are available from here. Auto-rickshaw services are extremely frequent in this area and are available from Kankurgachi to Phoolbagan, Salt Lake, EM Bypass, Sealdah, R. G. Kar Medical College and Hospital and Ganesh Talkies regularly. Kolkata tram route no. 18 serves Kankurgachi (via Maniktala Main Road-CIT Road).

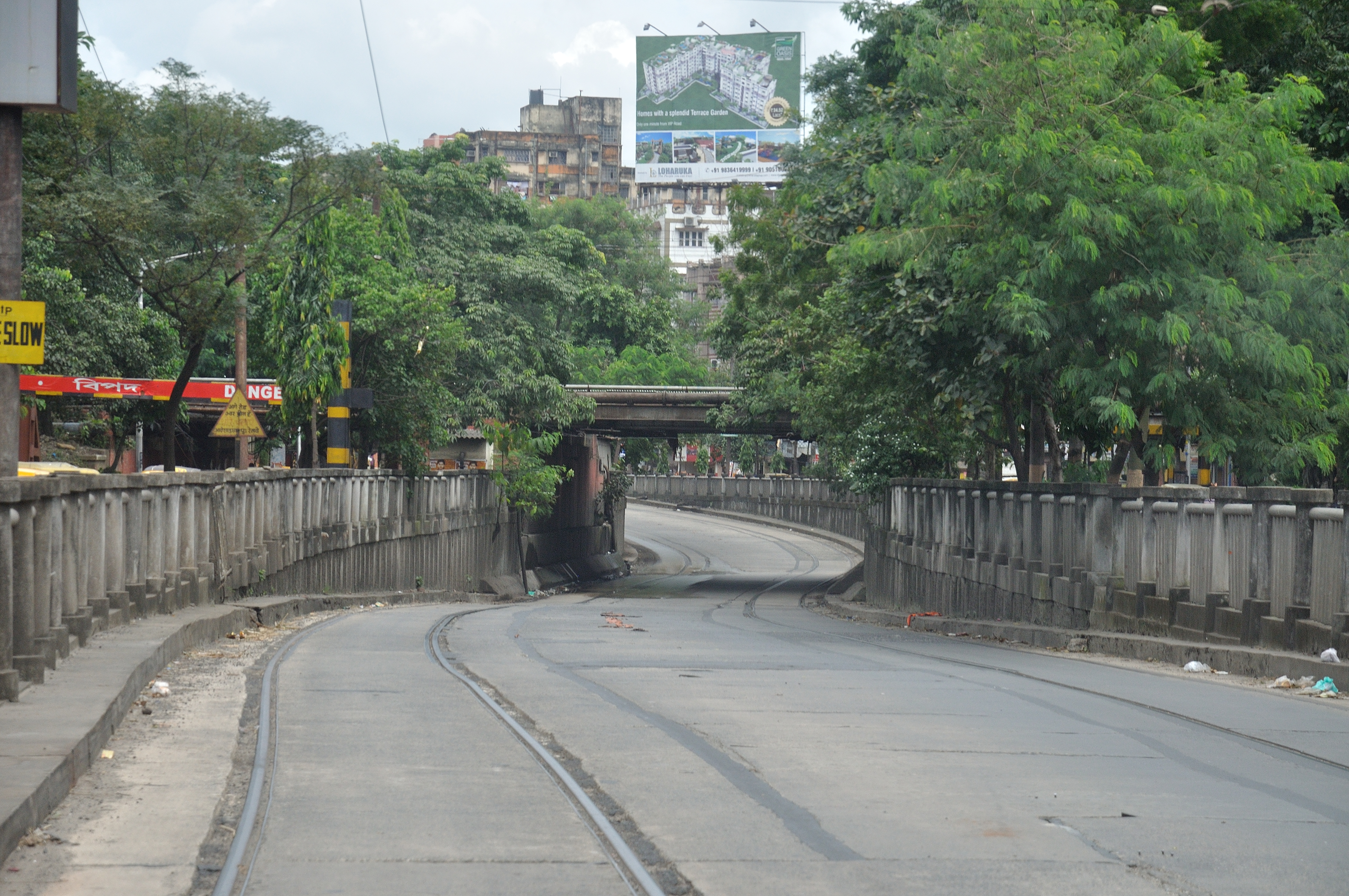
Kankurgachi Railway Bridge over Maniktala Main Road, Kankurgachi

Ultadanga, one of the city's important junctions and the location of one of Kolkata's busiest railway stations – Bidhannagar Road railway station, is a kilometer away from Kankurgachi. The place is a major junction to reach few other important destinations, namely the Netaji Subhas Chandra Bose International Airport (Dumdum/Kolkata Airport) and New Town.

== Economy ==
=== Industry ===
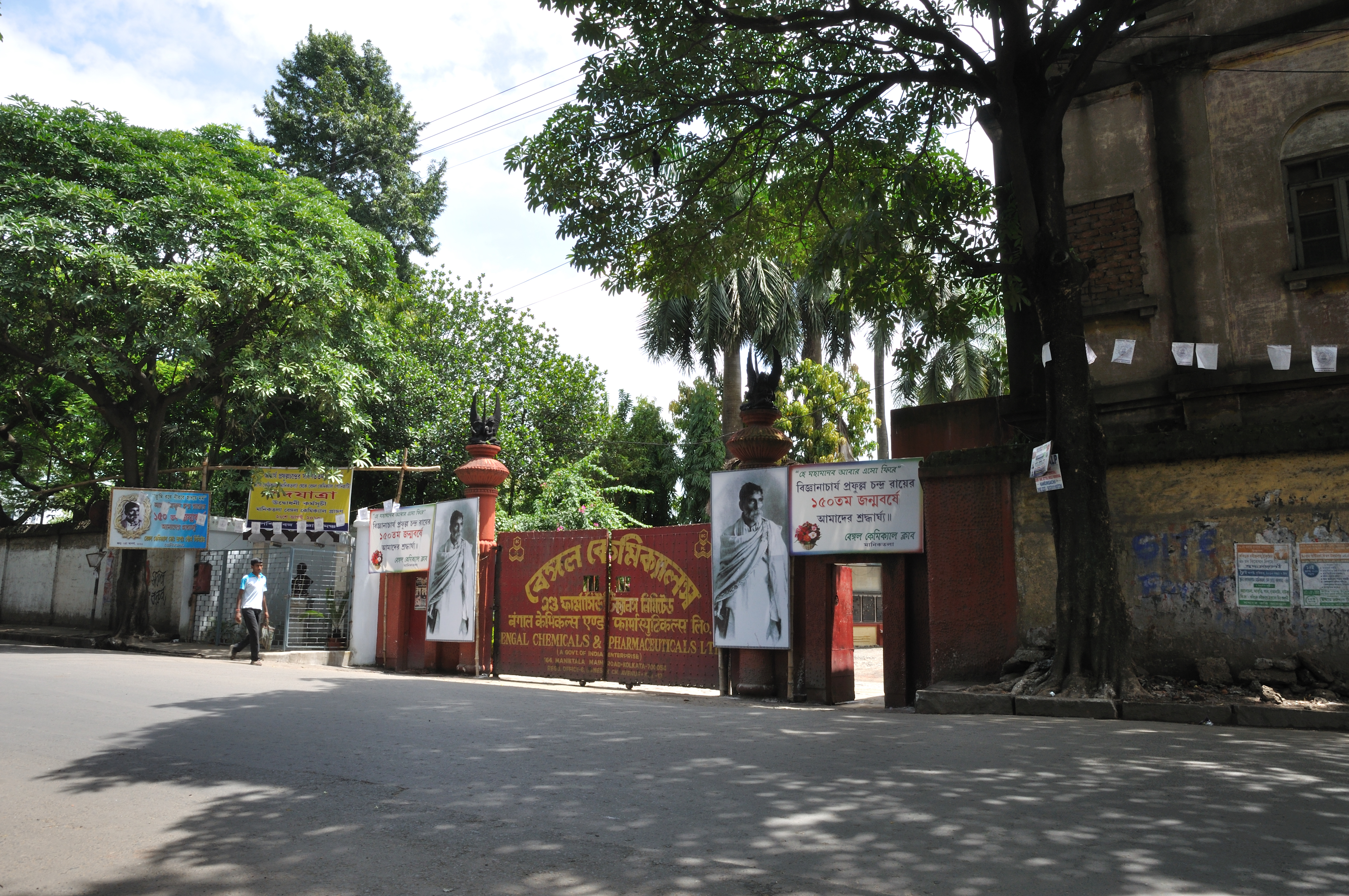
The main gate of the Maniktala Main Road factory of BCPL, Kolkata

Bengal Chemicals and Pharmaceuticals was founded by Acharya Prafulla Chandra Ray at Maniktala in 1892. The company shifted to its present site on Maniktala Main Road at Kankurgachi in 1901. Bengal Chemicals and Pharmaceuticals is now owned by the Central Government.

=== Commerce and services ===
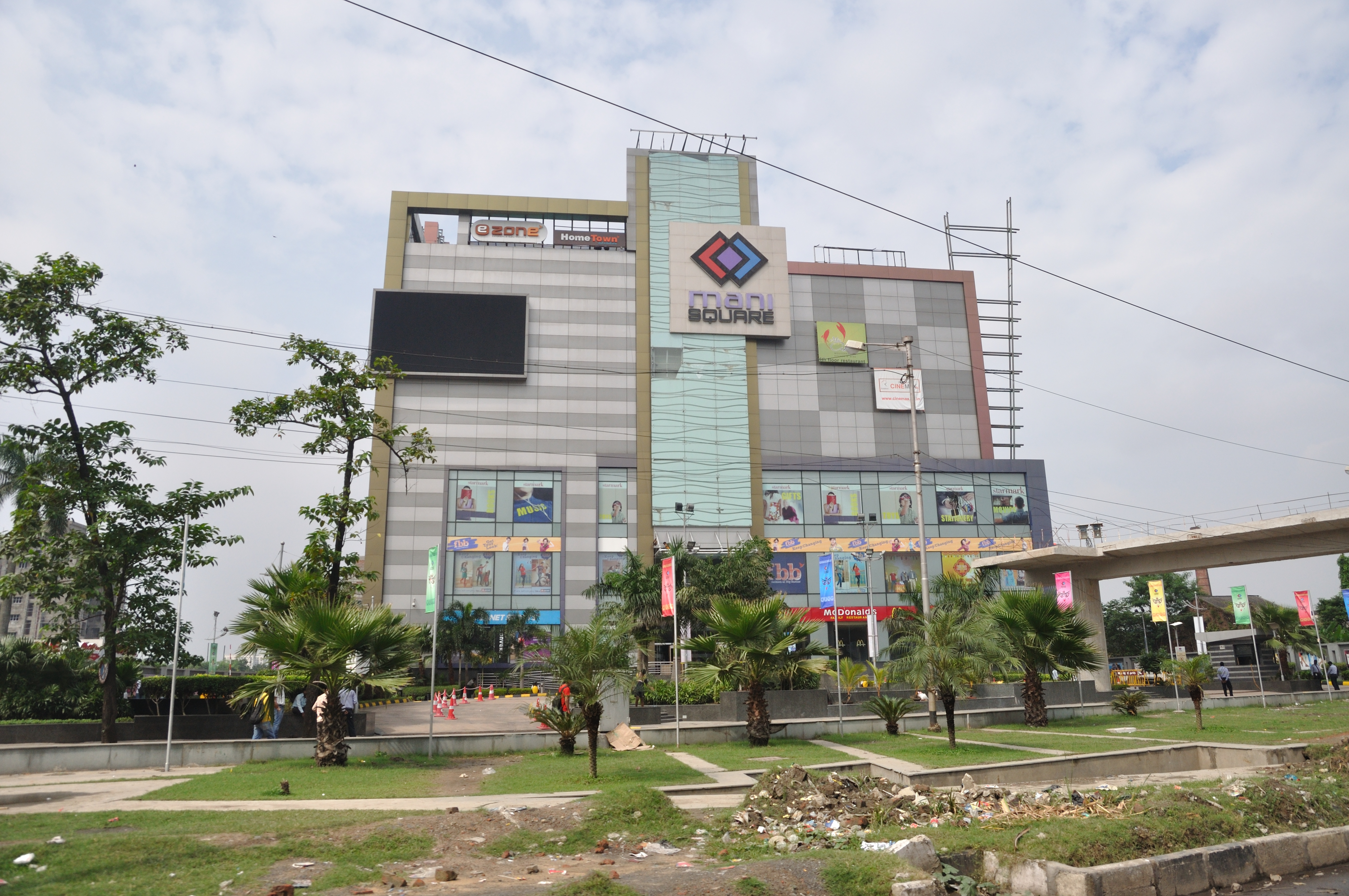
Mani Square, EM Bypass

Kankurgachi is primarily marked by a huge outlet of Pantaloons, one of India's leading retailers. Tanishq, Fabindia & M.P. Jewellers has been called a "jewellery hub" with several large jewelry stores in the area. Mani Square, one of the largest shopping mall-cum-multiplex of Kolkata, is also located here, which houses various luxury brands and restaurant. An outlet of the most famous diamond retail chain of India, Tribhovandas Bhimji Zaveri is also located in Kankurgachi. The famous pan India optical chain Lawrence and Mayo apart from World Of Titan and Titan Eye have their outlets here too.

Kankurgachi is considered to have "an excellent social infrastructure." Famous eateries dot the area viz. Hong Kong Chinese Restaurant, The Rose and Honey Da Dhaba. Espresso bars like Barista and Cafe Coffee Day are also located here. Domino's Pizza and Sharma's Tea have outlets too. Besides the Bhujia barons like Tewary, Haldiram and Bhikharam Chandmall have their outlets here too. Bidhan Sishu Udyan, a historical play and activity centre founded by the Late Atulya Ghosh is located here too.

The largest Muslim burial ground in Asia, the Bagmari Kabristan is also in Kankurgachi.

In addition, the area is also noted for providing good health care services. Apollo Hospitals, North City Hospital and a host of well equipped nursing homes and chemist shops like Frank Ross and Dhanwantary are located in Kankurgachi too. Kankurgachi has become home for all the major banks. Axis Bank, HDFC, ICICI, SBI, Allahabad Bank, Indian Bank, UBI, Yes Bank, Indusind Bank and PNB are some of the major banks located here. Many renowned educational and training centres are also situated in this area, the most prominent one being Arena Animation Kankurgachi, one of Eastern India's largest animation centres.

== Education ==
Harvard House, Purwanchal Vidyamandir are amongst the leading schools in this area, following CISCE curriculum. Other schools situated in this area are Surah Kanya Vidyalaya Girls' School, Narkeldanga High School and Shyamaprasad Mukherjee Institution. Gurudas College, affiliated to the University of Calcutta is also present in this area. Calcutta Boys' School, the iconic century-old educational institution also has its Beliaghata branch located in close vicinity. The zonal office of Damodar Valley Corporation, Uttarapan Shopping complex, Tata Teleservices (formerly Videsh Sanchar Nigam Ltd), the State Central Library, the State Labour Institute, and the Bureau of Indian Standards (ISI) Lakme Academy are also located in Kankurgachi.
