= Bidhannagar Road railway station =

Railway station in West Bengal, India

Bidhannagar Road
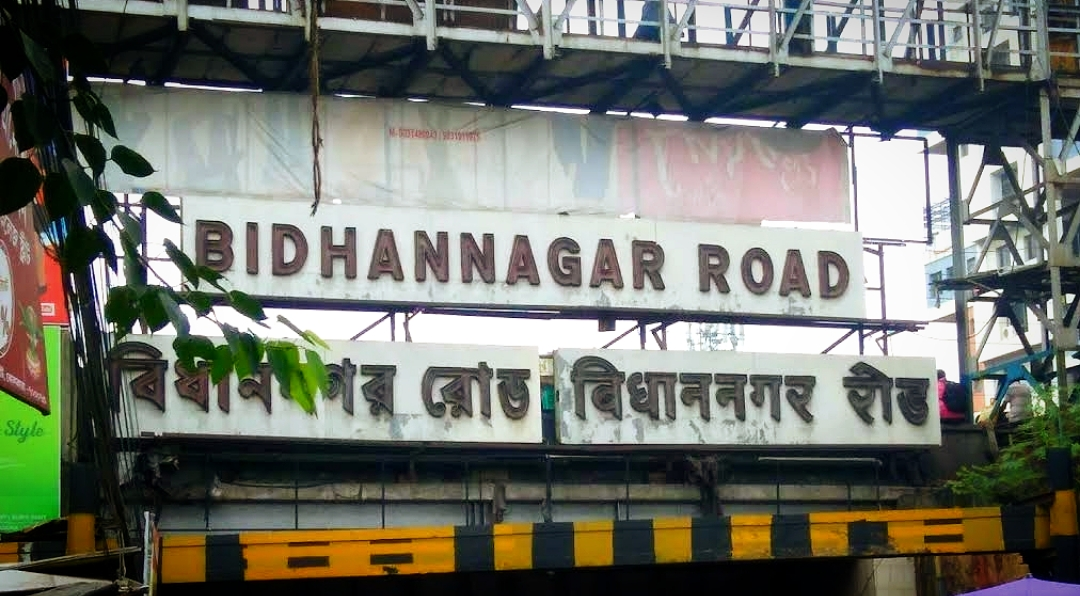
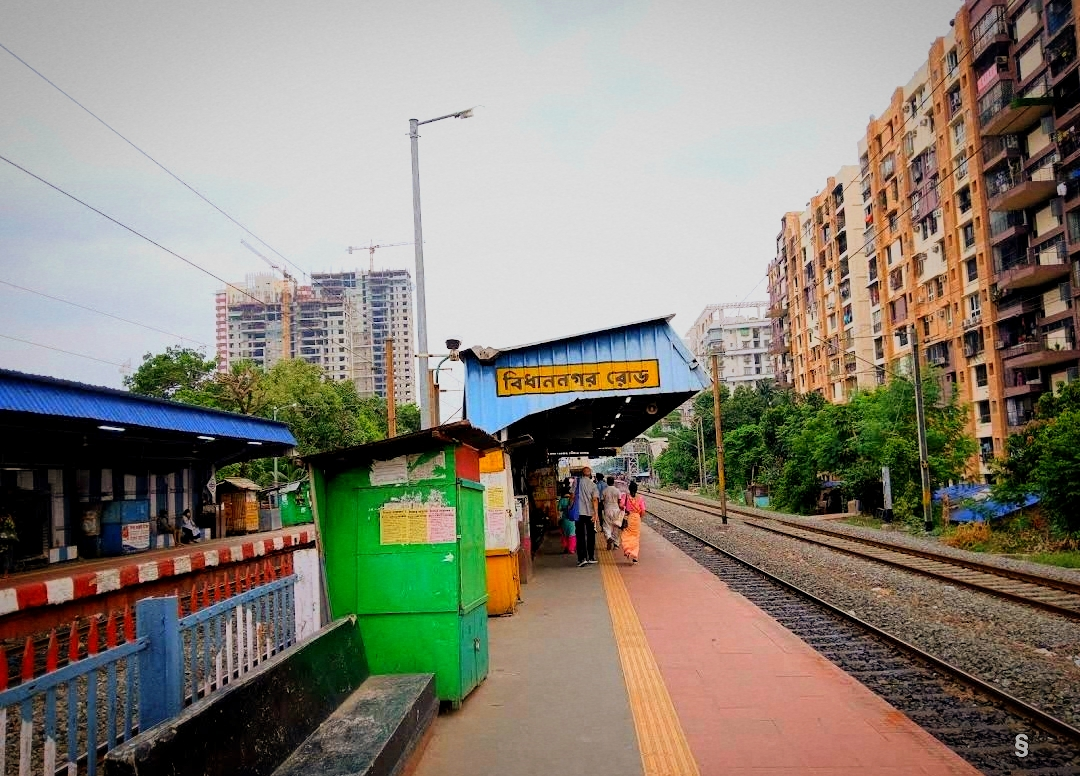

General information
- Location: Ultadanga, Kolkata, West Bengal 700054; India
- Coordinates: 22°35′28″N 88°23′27″E
- Elevation: 8.00 metres (26.25 ft)
- System: Kolkata Suburban Railway junction station
- Owner: Indian Railways
- Operator: Eastern Railway
- Line: Sealdah–Ranaghat line
- Platforms: 4
- Tracks: 4

Construction
- Structure type: At grade
- Parking: Not available
- Cycle facilities: Not available
- Accessible: Not available

Other information
- Status: Active
- Station code: BNXR
- Zone(s): Eastern Railway
- Division(s): Sealdah

History
- Opened: 1862; 164 years ago
- Electrified: 1963–1964; 62 years ago
- Former names: Eastern Bengal Railway
Services
Preceding station	Kolkata Suburban Railway	Following station
Sealdah Terminus	Eastern Line Main line	Dum Dum Junction towards Ranaghat Junction
Sealdah Terminus	Chord link Line	Dum Dum Junction towards Dankuni Junction
Sir Gurudas Banerjee Halt towards Dum Dum Junction	Circular Line	Dum Dum Junction Terminus
Location

Bidhannagar Road (formerly known as Ultadanga Road) is a Kolkata Suburban Railway junction station on the Sealdah–Ranaghat line. Its code is BNXR. It is linked to the Sealdah South lines via Sir Gurudas Banerjee Halt railway station. It is located in Ultadanga, Kolkata, West Bengal, India. It serves Ultadanga, Kankurgachi, Salt Lake and other surrounding areas in Kolkata.

== Naming ==
Under the initiative of former West Bengal Chief Minister Dr. Bidhan Chandra Roy, the town was built by pumping the alluvium containing the Ganges' saline water to fill the low-lying areas, hence the name was made 'Saline Lake' or 'Salt Lake'. In 1972, under the leadership of Indian Prime Minister Indira Gandhi, the Calcutta Session of the Indian National Congress was to be held in this 'Salt Lake'.

Congress delegates from all over India kept coming through Ultadanga station of Indian Railways. Incidentally, at that time, i.e. in 1972 AD, the name of 'Salt Lake' town was changed to 'Bidhanagar' and 'Ultadanga railway station' was renamed to 'Bidhanagar Road railway station'.

== Design ==
The station is rather uniquely designed. Platform no. 2 and 3 share the same island platform. However, the platform is very long (double the length of a normal platform) and is half the width of an island platform serving trains of both sides. The southern half of the platform is used as platform 2 and the northern half is used as platform 3. The section of track which is not being used by the platforms has been fenced to provide safety from the accelerating trains.

== History ==
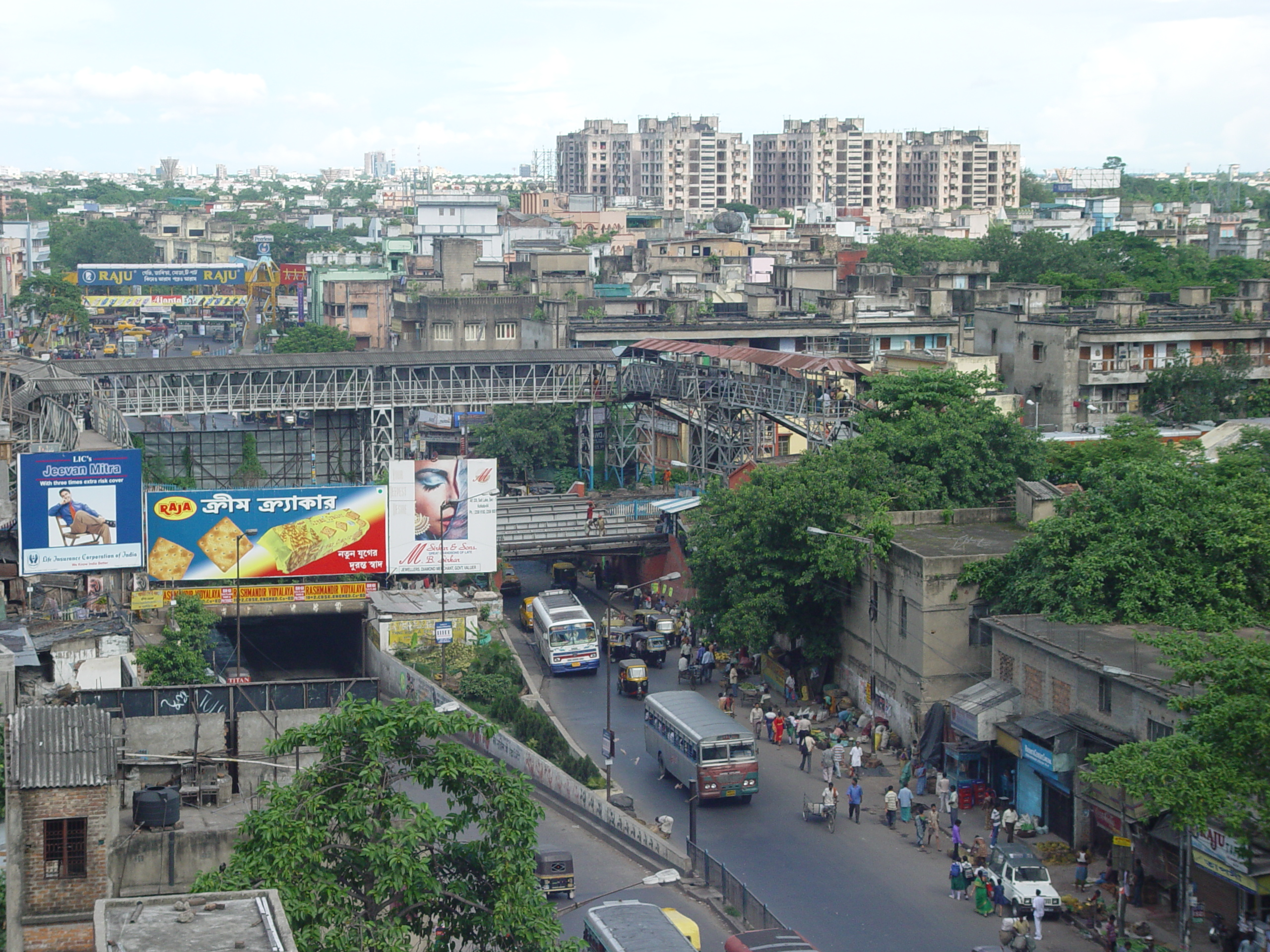
Bidhannagar Road railway station with underpass

The Sealdah–Kusthia line of Eastern Bengal Railway was opened to traffic in 1862. Eastern Bengal Railway worked on the eastern side of the Hooghly River.

== Electrification ==
The Sealdah–Ranaghat sector was electrified in 1963–64.

== Handling Capacity ==
Bidhannagar Road railway station handles 975,000 passengers every day, with about 325 trains in both directions.

== Connections ==
=== Bus ===
Bus route number 12C/2, 30C/1, 32A, 43/1, 44, 44A, 45, 46, 46A, 46B, 47/1, 79D, 91C, 201, 206, 211, 211B, 215, 215A, 215A/1, 217, 217A, 217B, 221, 223, 237, L238, 253, 260, DN8, DN16/1, DN17, KB16, KB17, KB21, KB22, JM2, JM4, 007, K1, 5 (Mini), 20 (Mini), 20A (Mini), 29 (Mini), S138 (Mini), S151 (Mini), S152 (Mini), S171 (Mini), S172 (Mini), S175 (Mini), S184 (Mini), C14/1, C41, C42, C48, D7/1, D11A, D20, D22, E17, E25, E25A, E36, E39, E46, E47, MX1, MX3, S12C, S14C, S16, S19, S21, S30A, S30D, S37, S37A, S58, T11, 15, AC2, AC10, AC30, AC30S, AC35, AC37, AC37C, AC39, AC49A, AC50, AC50A, ACT5, ACT7, ACT9, M4, M10, MN5, MN10, MN20, MW7, V1, VS1, VS2, VS14, ST7, ST15, ST21 serve the station.

=== Metro ===
Shyambazar metro station, Shobhabazar Sutanuti metro station, Bengal Chemical metro station and Phoolbagan metro station are located nearby.

=== Tram ===
Tram route number 18 serves the station.

=== Air ===
Netaji Subhas Chandra Bose International Airport is about 9 km at the distance via VIP Road.

== See also ==
- Dum Dum Junction railway station
- Sealdah railway station
- Belgharia railway station
