= Beliaghata =

Beliaghata Beleghata
- Neighbourhood in Kolkata (Calcutta)
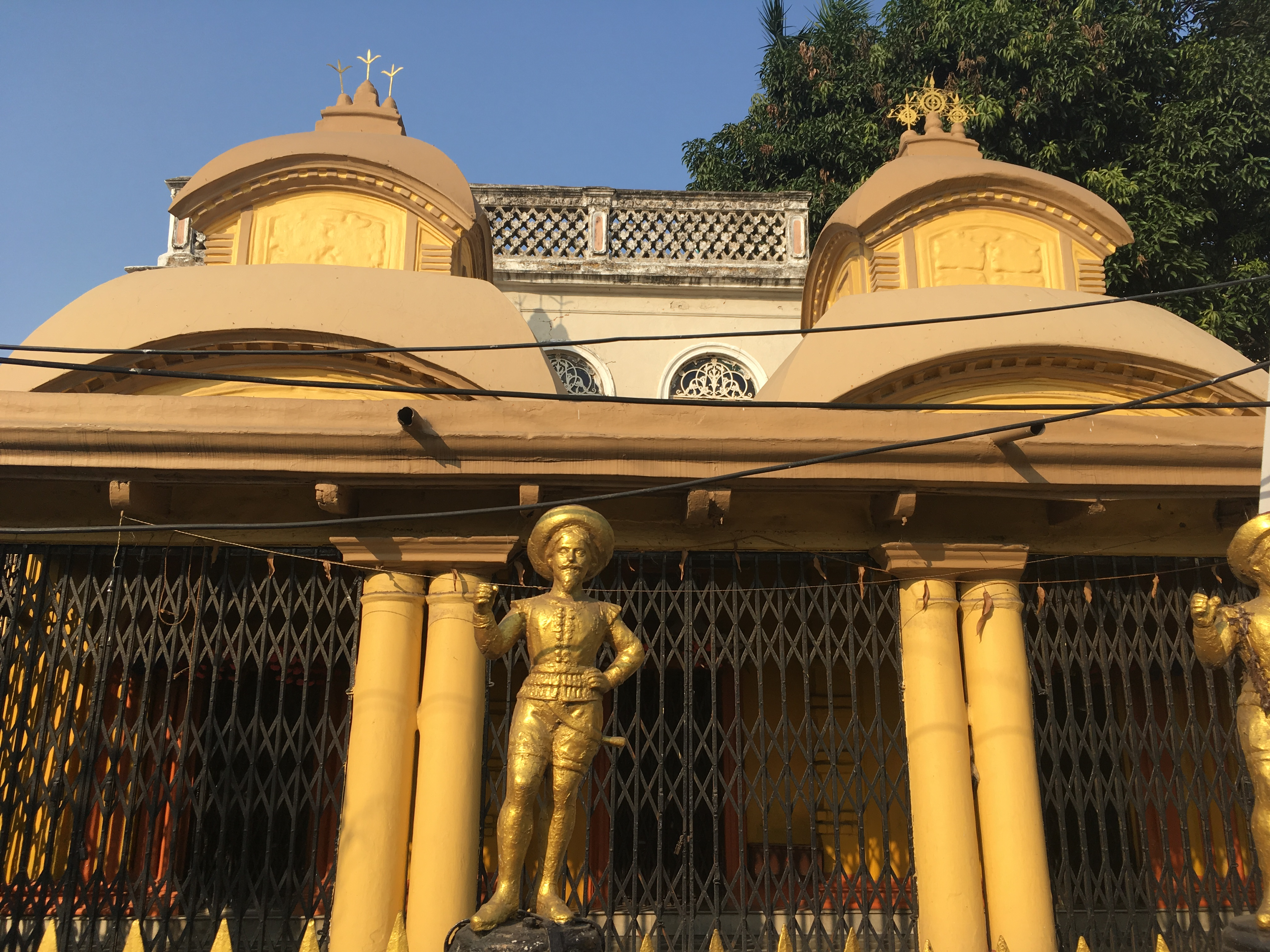
- Jora Mandir, Beliaghata
- Interactive map of Beliaghata
- Coordinates: 22.567667°N 88.393623°E
- Country: India
- State: West Bengal
- City: Kolkata
- District: Kolkata
- Metro Station: Beleghata, Phoolbagan and Sealdah
- Municipal Corporation: Kolkata Municipal Corporation
- KMC wards: 33, 34, 35, 36

Government
  - Type: Corporation

Population
  - Total: For population see linked KMC ward pages
- Time zone: UTC+5:30 (IST)
- PIN: 700010, 700015, 700085
- Area code: +91 33
- Lok Sabha constituency: Kolkata Uttar
- Vidhan Sabha constituency: Beleghata

Beliaghata, also known as Beleghata, is a neighbourhood of East Kolkata, in Kolkata district in the Indian state of West Bengal.

== History ==
The East India Company obtained from the Mughal emperor Farrukhsiyar, in 1717, the right to rent from 38 villages surrounding their settlement. Of these 5 lay across the Hooghly in what is now Howrah district. The remaining 33 villages were on the Calcutta side. After the fall of Siraj-ud-daulah, the last independent Nawab of Bengal, it purchased these villages in 1758 from Mir Jafar and reorganised them. These villages were known en-bloc as Dihi Panchannagram and Beliaghata was one of them. It was considered to be a suburb beyond the limits of the Maratha Ditch.

In 1889, the 'fringe areas' of Maniktala, Ultadanga and Beliaghata were added to the Kolkata Municipal Corporation.

In 1892, Shri Gagan Chandra Sarkar, having made a huge fortune from his enormous Fishery Business and having acquired a huge portion of the East Kolkata Wetlands, established himself as the zamindar of Beliaghata and built his Palatial Mansion Beleghata Sarkar Bari on the modern Beleghata Main Road (currently Dr Suresh Chandra Banerjee Road). The house remains, to this date, as one of the major historical places in Beliaghata.

== Geography ==
Beliaghata overall is a highly populated locality due to its residing middle-class people of the Kolkataian society. Low height house are the main cause of reduction for space of roads. Mostly pedestrians can pass through the narrow roads of Beliaghata.

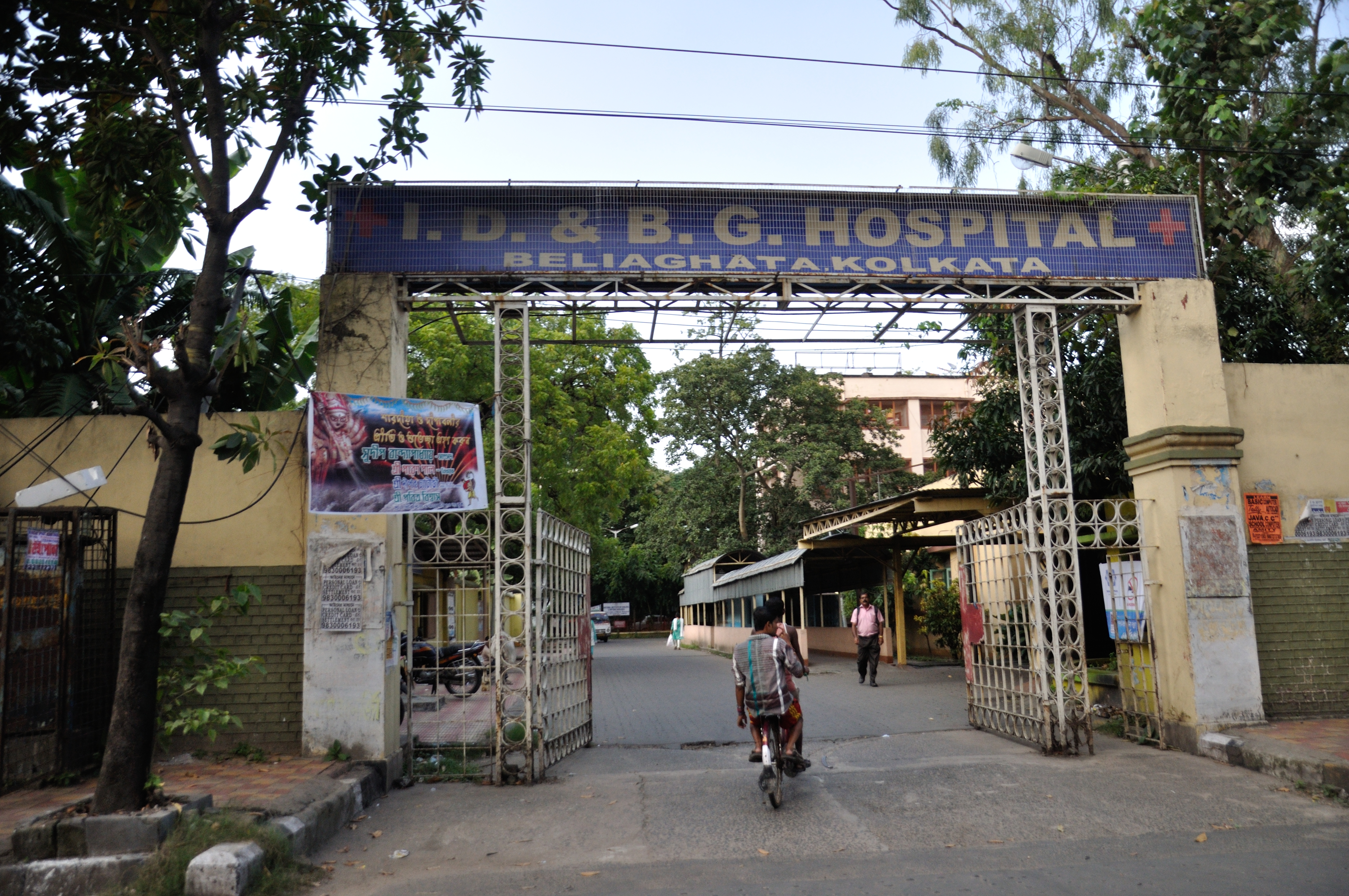
ID And BG Hospital, Beliaghata

=== Police district ===
Beliaghata police station is part of the Eastern Suburban division of Kolkata Police. It is located at P-57 CIT Road, Kolkata-700010.

Ultadanga Women police station covers all police districts under the jurisdiction of the Eastern Suburban division i.e. Beliaghata, Entally, Maniktala, Narkeldanga, Ultadanga, Tangra and Phoolbagan.

== Transport ==
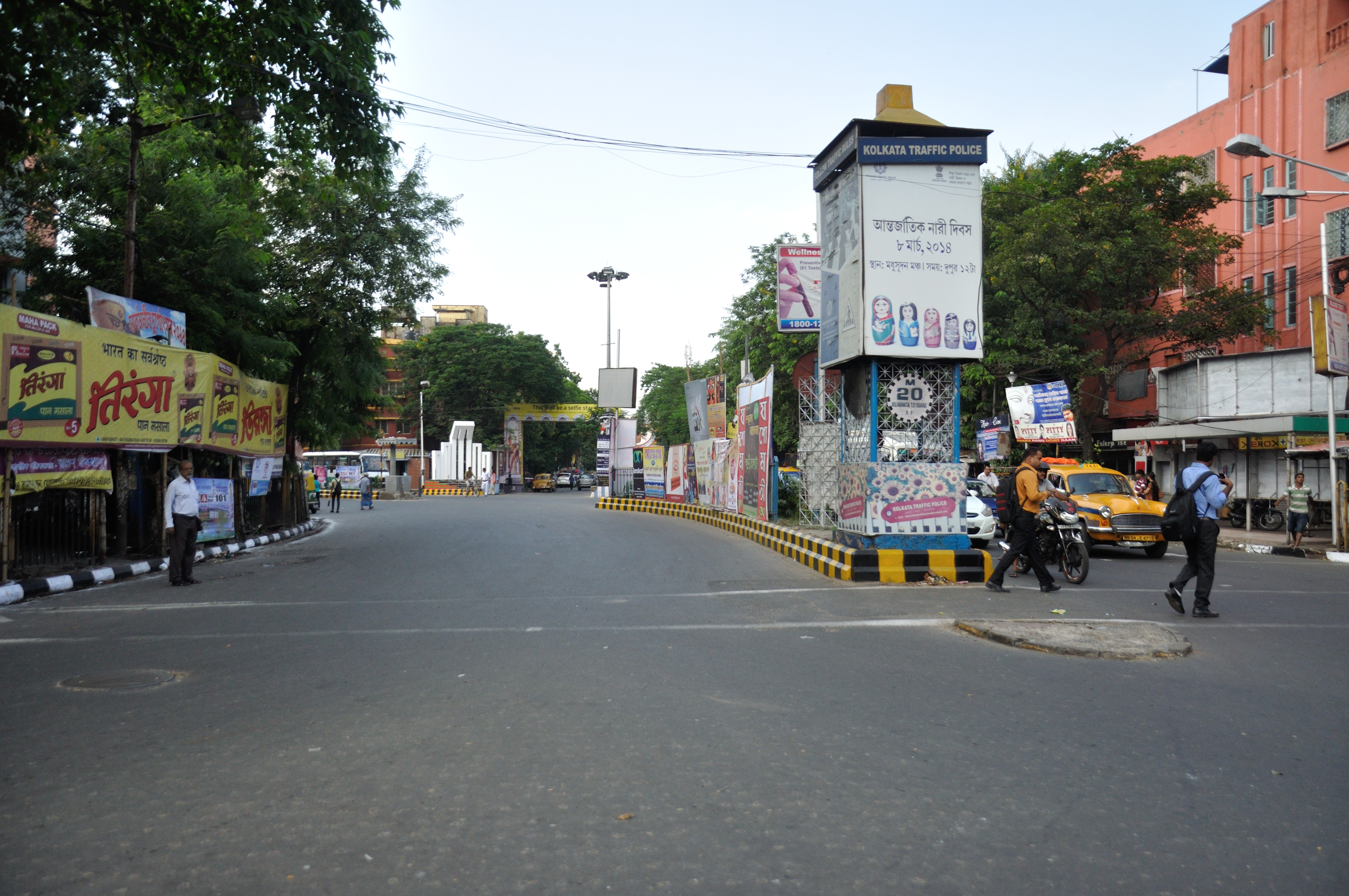
CIT More, Beliaghata

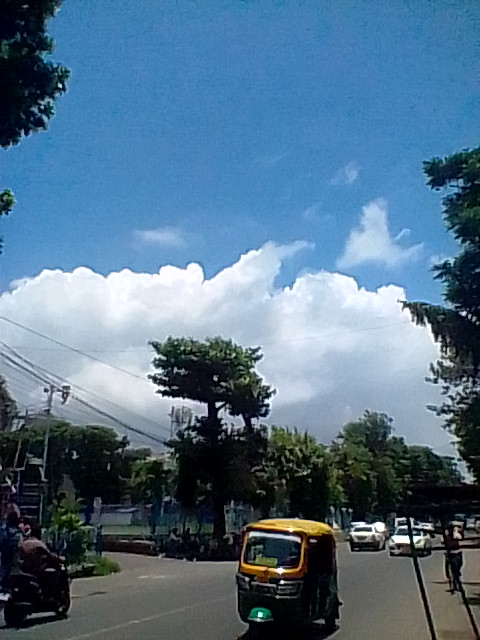
Beleghata Main Road before ID and BG Hospital

Beliaghata Main Road, which is one of the city's major connectors, connects Eastern Metropolitan Bypass to Central Kolkata. Eastern Metropolitan Bypass (in short EM Bypass), which is the most important highway of Kolkata, passes along the eastern boundary of Beliaghata. CIT Road (Hem Chandra Naskar Road) also starts from Beliaghata Main Road (at CIT More) and connects the locality with Ultadanga. Many buses and auto-rickshaws ply along these roads. Canal Side Road (Chaulpatty Road), which runs beside Beliaghata Canal, helps light vehicles to move around through the densely populated Beliaghata.

However, Beliaghata has a police station at CIT More near Subhas Sarobar and this police station is in the control of a huge area. Traffic jam being the main problem here, police are working hard to make smooth flow of vehicles. Beliaghata has 4 major crossing points:- first is Building More (Chingrighata), second is CIT More, third lies between CIT More and Sealdah i.e. Alochhaya Cinema bus stop and fourth crossing over the Beleghata Canal (Khalpool).

Sealdah Station, one of the major railway-terminals of the city, is the nearest railway station. 22°34′N 88°23′E

The Phoolbagan metro station serves this area.
