= Ultadanga =

Ultadanga উল্টোডাঙা
- Neighbourhood in Kolkata (Calcutta)
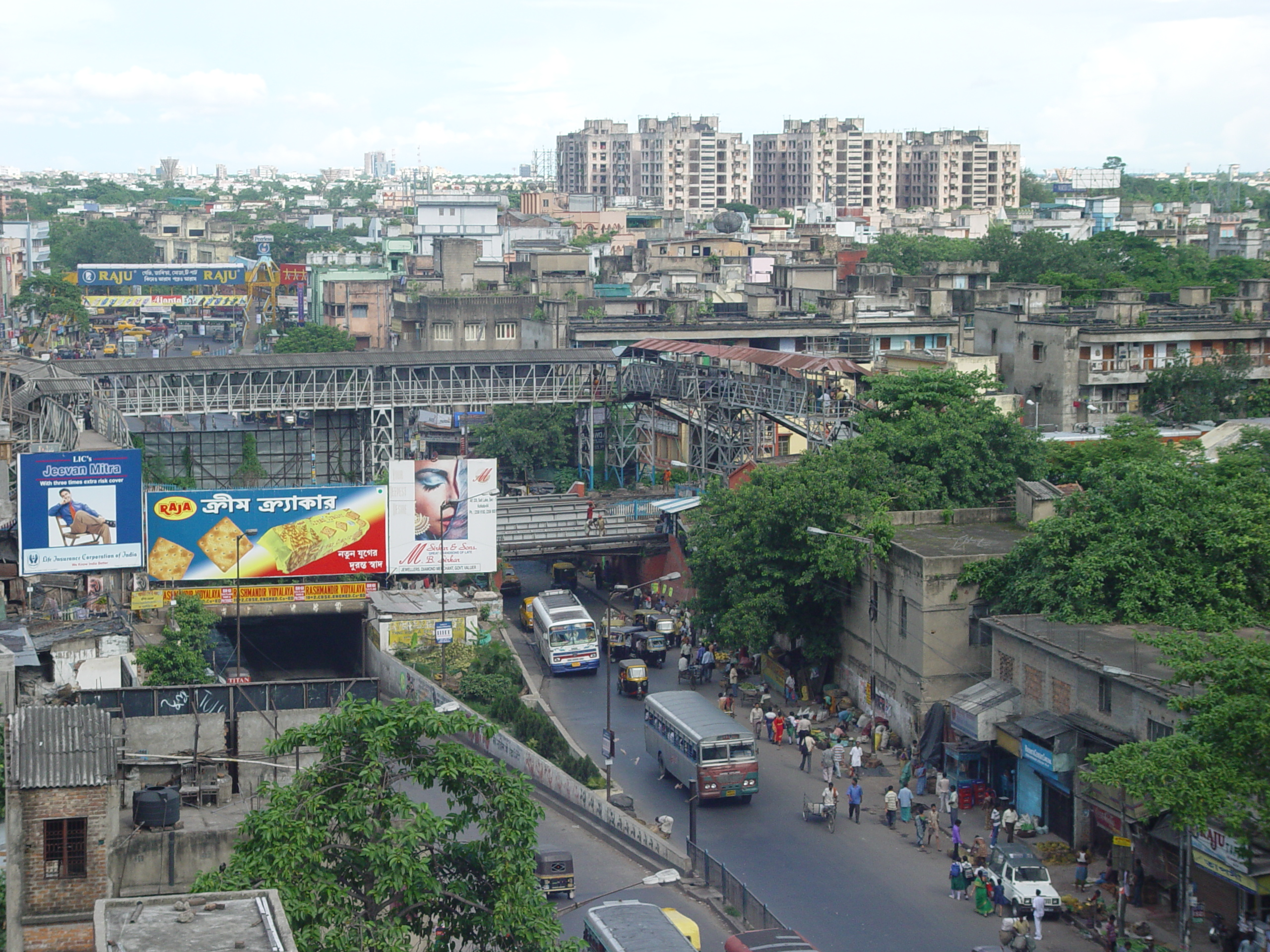

- Location in Kolkata
- Coordinates: 22.59225°N 88.389528°E
- Country: India
- State: West Bengal
- City: Kolkata
- District: Kolkata
- Metro Station: Shyambazar; Shobhabazar Sutanuti; Bengal Chemical; Phoolbagan
- Municipal Corporation: Kolkata Municipal Corporation
- KMC wards: 13, 14, 32

Population
  - Total: For population see linked KMC ward pages
- Time zone: UTC+5:30 (IST)
- PIN: 700054, 700067
- Area code: +91 33
- Lok Sabha constituency: Kolkata Uttar
- Vidhan Sabha constituency: Maniktala

Ultadanga is a locality of North Kolkata in Kolkata district in the Indian state of West Bengal. It is one of the important junctions in North Kolkata. Prominent places include Muchi Bazar and Telenga Bagan.

== Etymology ==
Ultadanga lay outside the Maratha Ditch, beyond Halsibagan, where the Sikh billionaire Umichand had a garden. It was the land on the opposite bank (ulta in Bengali).

== History ==
The East India Company obtained from the Mughal emperor Farrukhsiyar, in 1717, the right to rent from 38 villages surrounding their settlement. Of these, 5 lay across the Hooghly in what is now Howrah district. The remaining 33 villages were on the Calcutta side. After the fall of Siraj-ud-daulah, the last independent Nawab of Bengal, it purchased these villages in 1758 from Mir Jafar and reorganised them. These villages were known en-bloc as Dihi Panchannagram and Ultadanga was one of them. It was considered to be a suburb beyond the limits of the Maratha Ditch.

The name, Ulta Danga, comes from the original name of the place, Ulta Dingi, or a place where small boats which were colloquially called Dingis were made or repaired. It was a ghat area and chances are that this too would be on the banks of the Ganges at some point of time in history, before the river changed its course.

In 1889, Maniktala, Ultadanga and Beliaghata became 'fringe area wards' of the Kolkata Municipal Corporation.

== Geography ==
=== Police district ===
Ultadanga police station is part of the Eastern Suburban division of Kolkata Police. It is located at Block 13, CIT Scheme No. VIII M, Kolkata-700067.

Ultadanga Women police station, located at the same address as above, covers all police districts under the jurisdiction of the Eastern Suburban division i.e. Beliaghata, Entally, Manicktolla, Narkeldanga, Ultadanga, Tangra and Phoolbagan.

== Economy ==
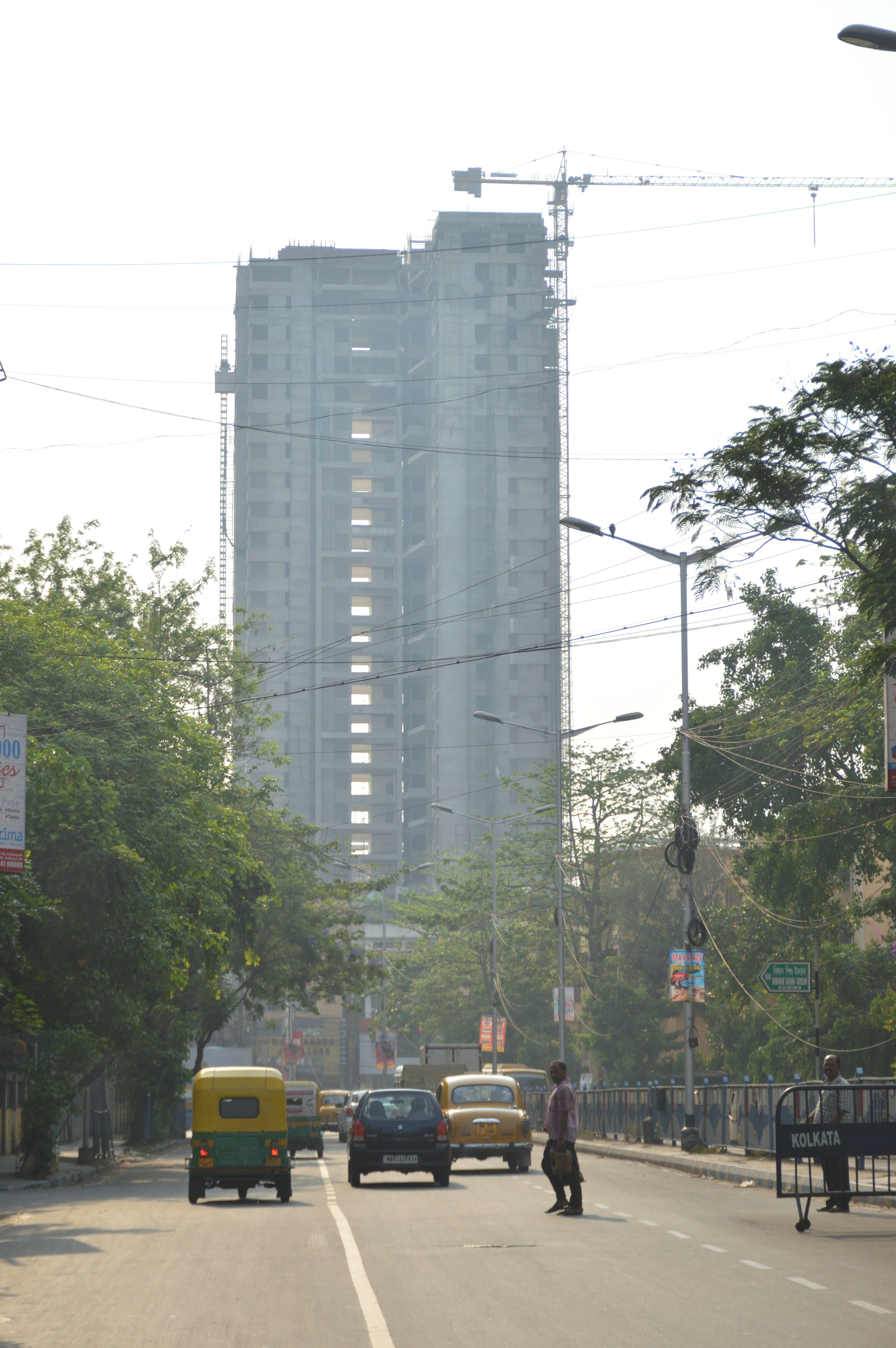
Mani Imperial (Residential Complex), Ultadanga

Ultadanga is densely populated with not only people but also with shops, restaurants, shopping malls, banks, Government housing, Government and private offices, educational and training institutes etc. Ultadanga is near to some of the most happening shopping malls in the city like Mani Square, City Center, Charnok City and Pantaloon in Kankurgachi etc. Sony World, one of Kolkata’s biggest Sony showrooms, is located at Ultadanga crossing near the station. Arena Animation Kankurgachi, Jetking Institute, FIIT JEE, DGCT BRAIN Credence Academy, Kolkata Cables, BSNL and BrandMantra Solutions Pvt. Ltd. are some of the prominent institutes and offices in Ultadanga and its surrounding areas.

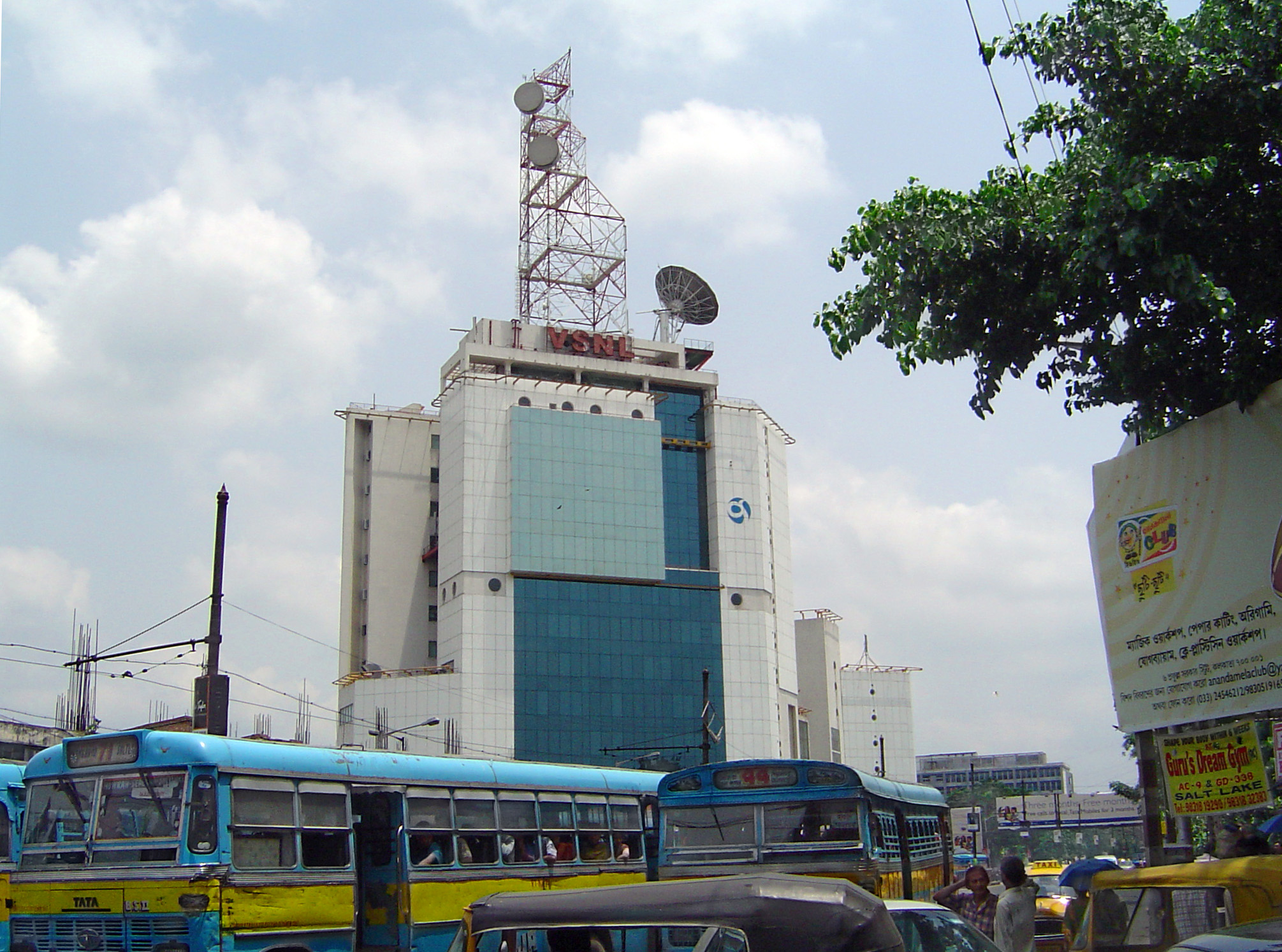
BSNL Tower, CIT Road, Ultadanga

== Transport ==
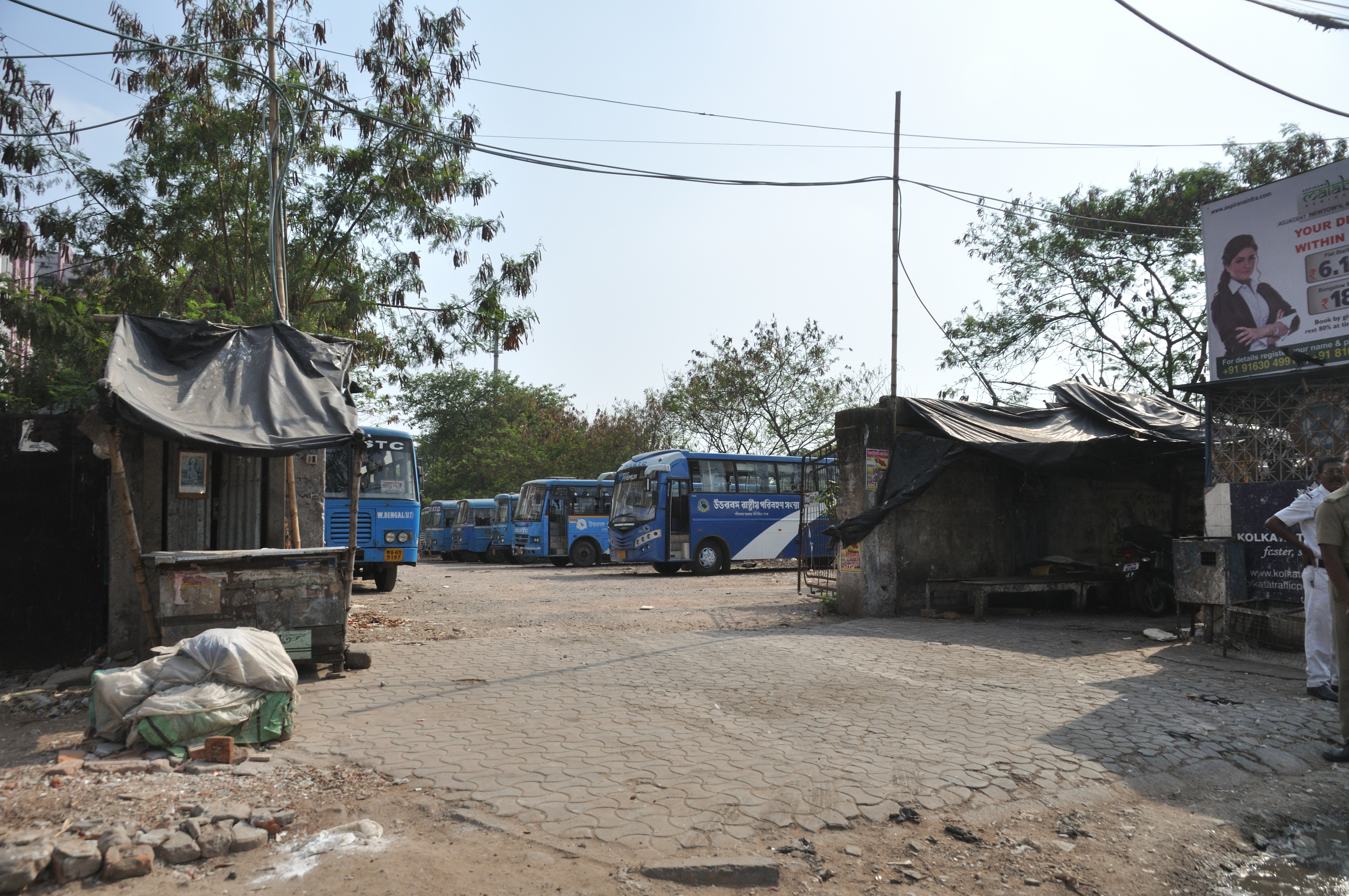
WBTC Ultadanga Bus Depot

=== WBTC Bus ===
- AC-30S (Ultadanga - Ecospace)
- S-30 (Ultadanga - Ecospace)
- S-30A (Ultadanga - Ultadanga)
- S 21 (Baghbazar - Garia)

Hudco More in Ultadanga is one of the busiest crossings in Kolkata. It is the junction of four roads:- Ultadanga Main Road/ Bidhannagar Road (towards Maniktala), VIP Road (towards Lake Town), CIT Road (towards Kankurgachi) and Bagmari Road/ 1st Avenue (towards Salt Lake). EM Bypass also runs parallel to CIT Road on the eastern boundary of Ultadanga. Many buses along with taxis and auto-rickshaws are available on these roads. Kolkata tram route no. 18 serves Ultadanga (via CIT Road). Ultadanga and Gouribari (Maniktala) are connected with Arobindo Setu (Gouribari Bridge), which was constructed in 1974. In 2011, Ultadanga Flyover was opened in Ultadanga to connect EM Bypass with VIP Road easily.

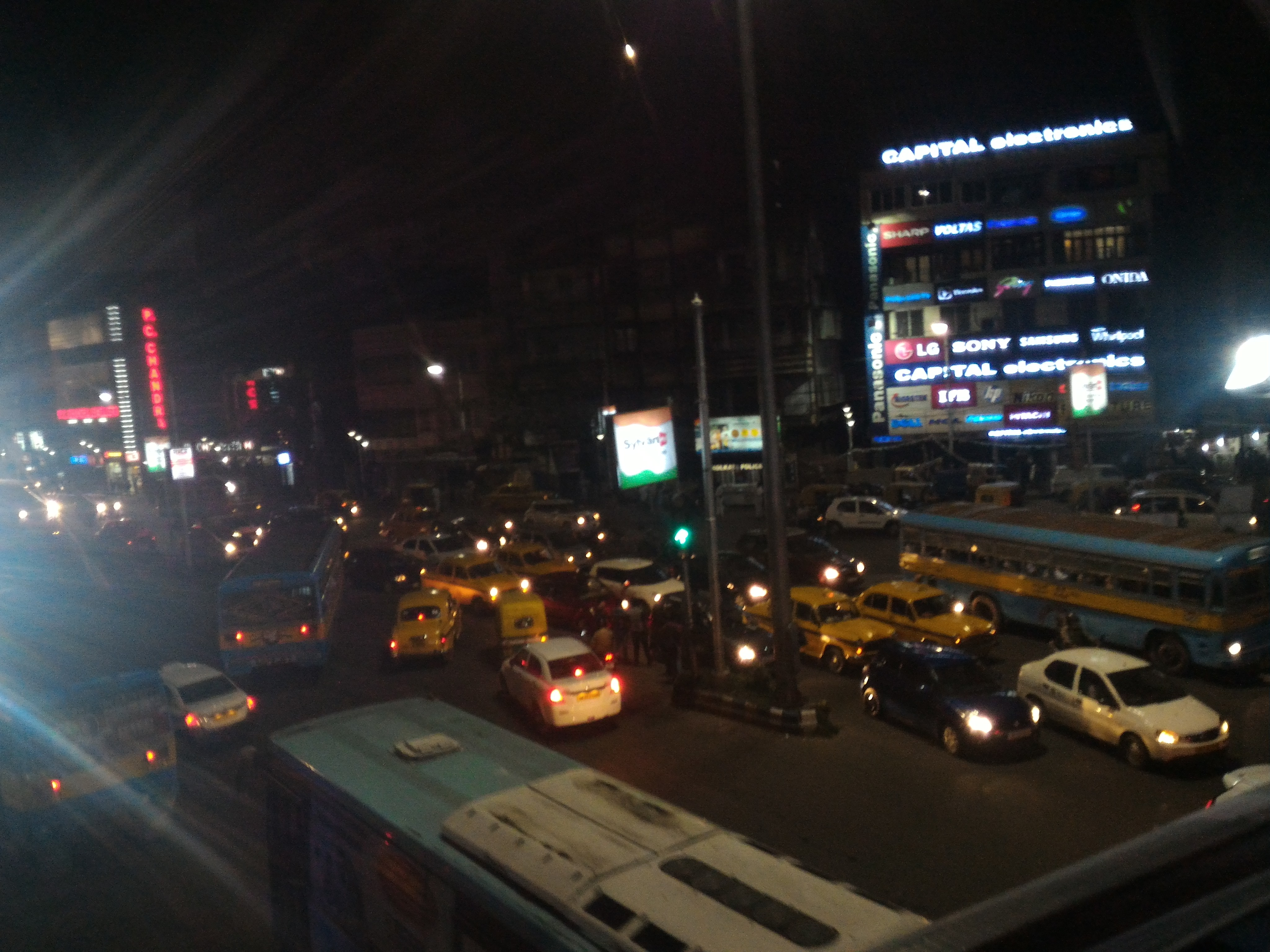
Busy VIP Road in Ultadanga at night

One of Kolkata’s busiest railway stations, Bidhannagar Road railway station, is located in Ultadanga. It remains packed with passengers throughout the day especially on weekdays.

== Education ==
The Sir Gurudas Mahavidyalaya, a college previously known as Gurudas College of Commerce, affiliated to the University of Calcutta, is located in Ultadanga.

== Incidents ==
On 12 January 2010, a fire broke out at a slum in Ultadanga, popularly known as 'Basanti Colony', leaving 1 man dead and 450 homeless. The homes were rebuilt by the Government and were redistributed among the residents free of cost within 6 months.
