= Phoolbagan metro station =

Metro station in Kolkata, India

Phoolbagan
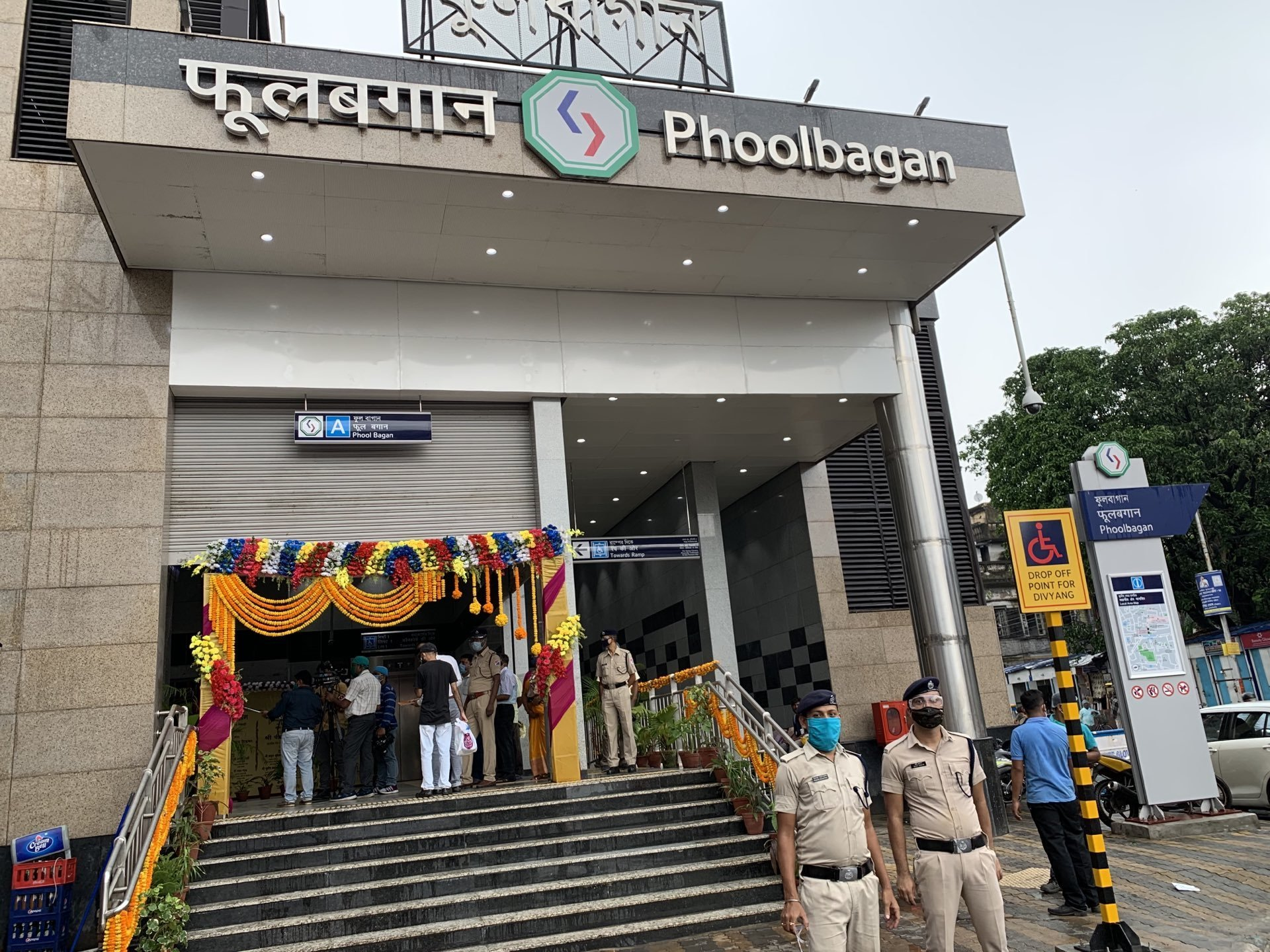
- The metro station entrance, during its inauguration in January 2021.

General information
- Location: 181, Narkeldanga Main Road; Phoolbagan, Kankurgachi; Kolkata, West Bengal 700054; India
- Coordinates: 22.57212°N 88.39024°E
- System: Kolkata Metro
- Operator: Metro Railway, Kolkata
- Line: Green Line
- Platforms: 2 (1 island platform)

Construction
- Structure type: Underground
- Accessible: Yes
- Architect: Lee Harris Pomeroy Architects with SGI

Other information
- Status: Operational
- Station code: PBGB

History
- Opened: 4 October 2020; 5 years ago

Services
Preceding station	Kolkata Metro	Following station
Sealdah towards Howrah Maidan	Green Line	Salt Lake Stadium towards Salt Lake Sector-V
Route map
Location

Phoolbagan (also known as LIC Phoolbagan for sponsorship reasons) is an underground metro station on the East-West corridor of the Green Line of Kolkata Metro in Phoolbagan, a north neighbourhood of Kolkata, India. The underground station is at the Phoolbagan crossing on the Narkeldanga Main Road. It is near to the Gurudas College and Dr. Shyamaprasad Mukherjee Institution. The station opened on 4 October 2020 and commercial services started the next day.

== The Station ==
=== Structure ===
This is the first underground station on the line and features an island platform.

=== Layout ===
G	Street level	Exit/Entrance
L1	Concourse	Fare control, station agent, Ticket/token, shops
L2	Platform 1	Train towards Salt Lake Sector-V (Salt Lake Stadium) →
L2	Island platform, Doors will open on the right
L2	Platform 2	← Train towards Howrah Maidan (Sealdah)

== Connections ==
=== Rail ===
Sir Gurudas Banerjee Halt is 500m away from the metro station.

=== Air ===
Netaji Subhash Chandra Bose International Airport is 10.6 km (6.6 mi) via VIP Road & C.I.T Road.

== See also ==
- List of Kolkata Metro stations
