= List of parks in Kolkata =

Parks in Kolkata

Below is the list of urban parks or gardens, zoological gardens, botanical gardens and amusement parks in the city or outskirts of Kolkata, more precisely in the Kolkata Metropolitan Area.

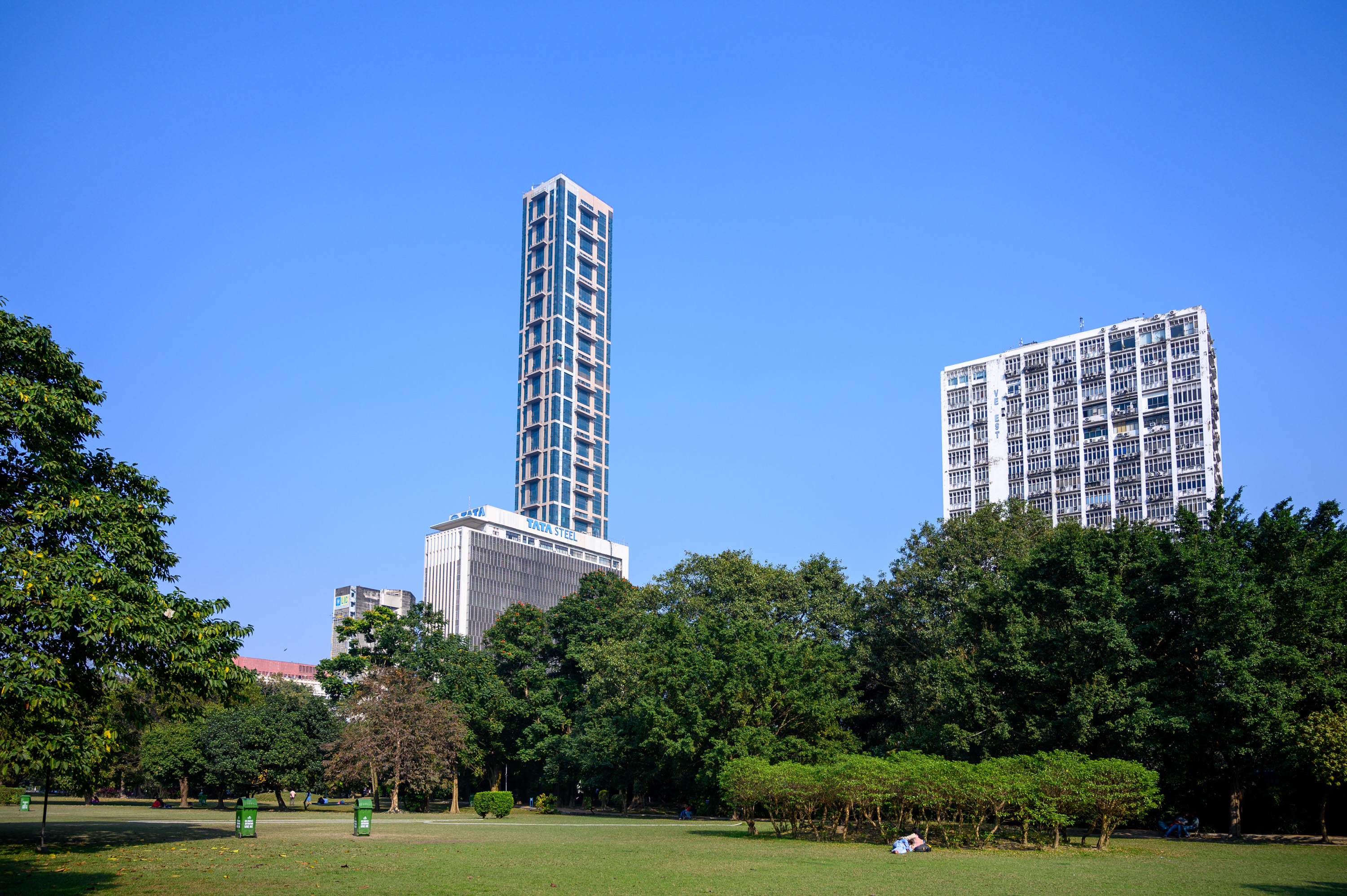
Kolkata skyline across the Maidan

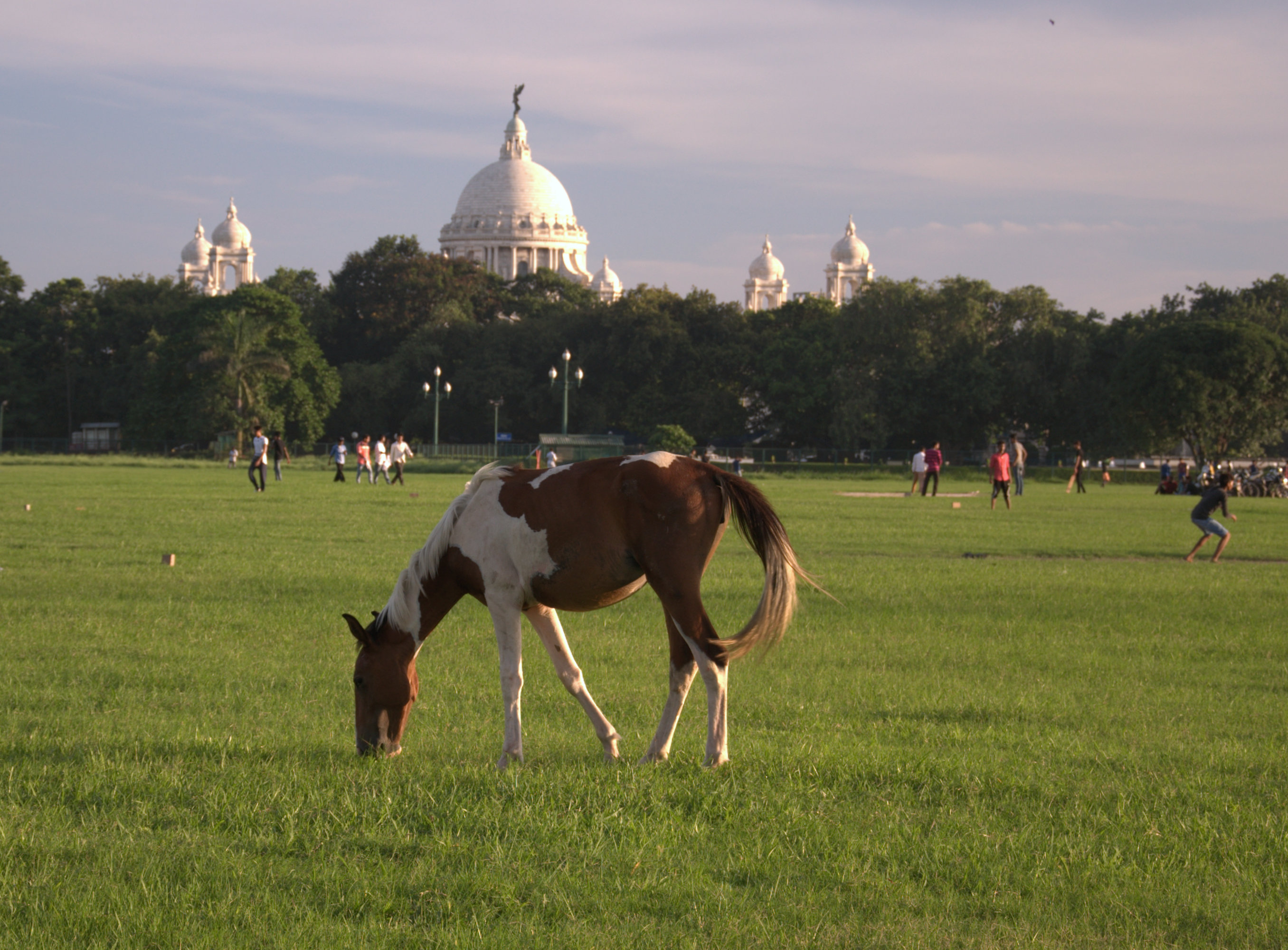
View of the Victoria Memorial Hall

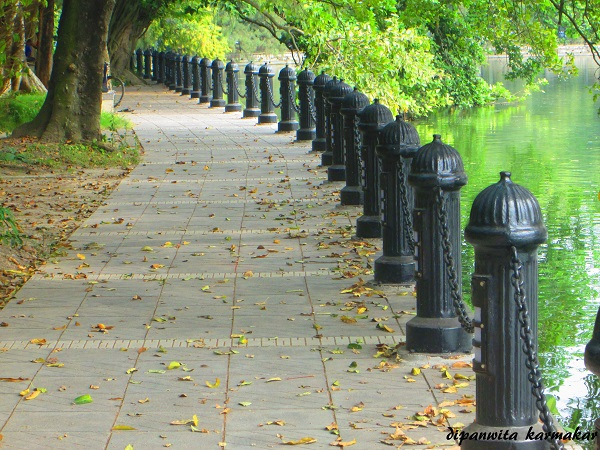
Rabindra Sarobar

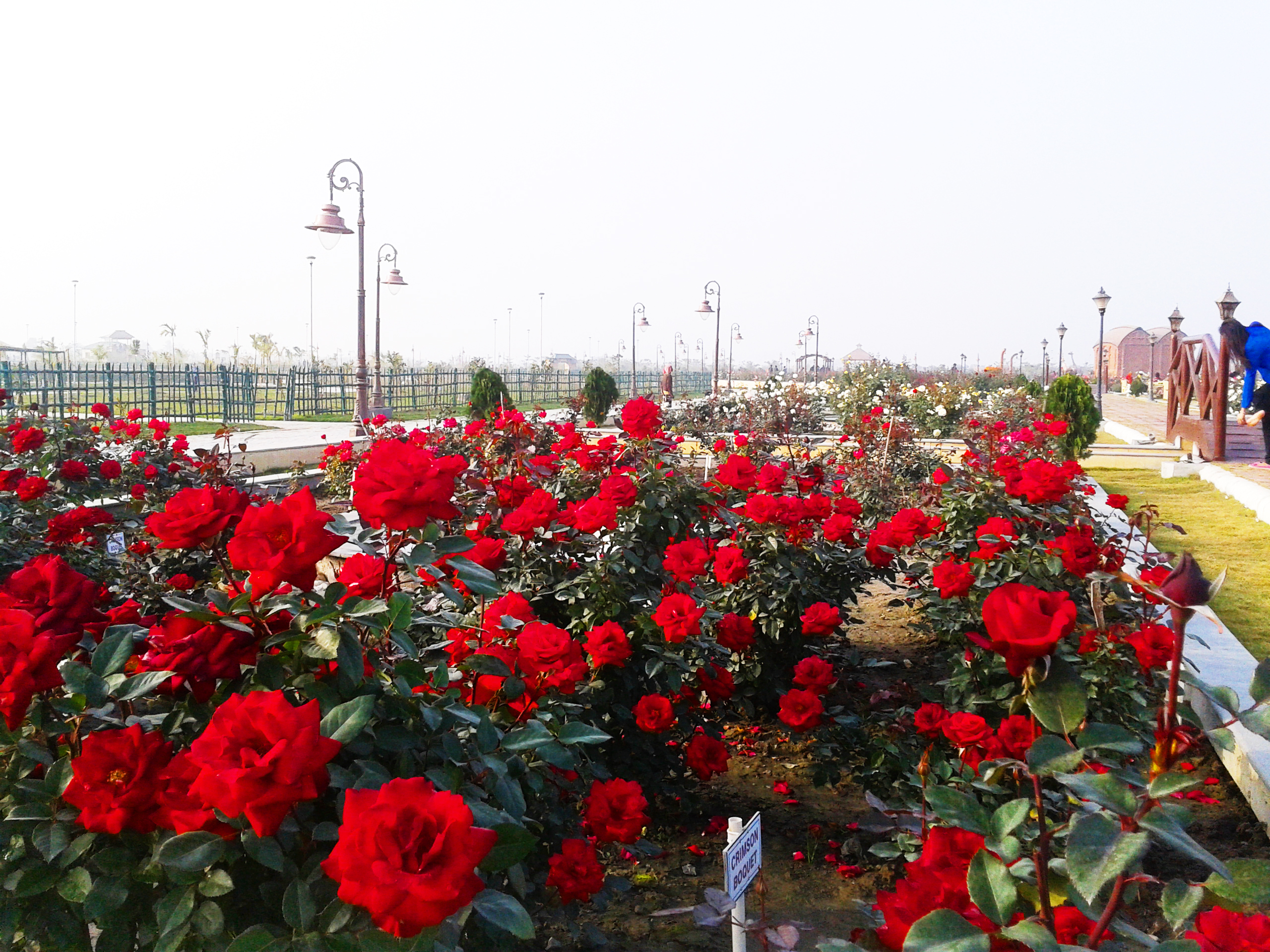
Valley of flowers at Eco Park

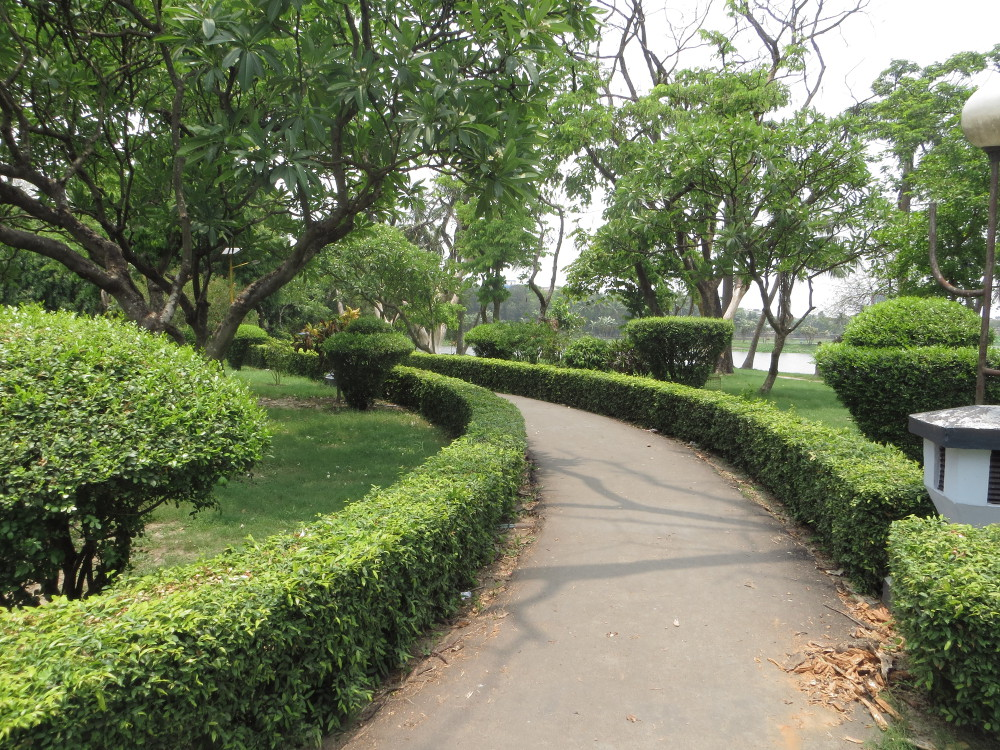
Walking track at Central Park

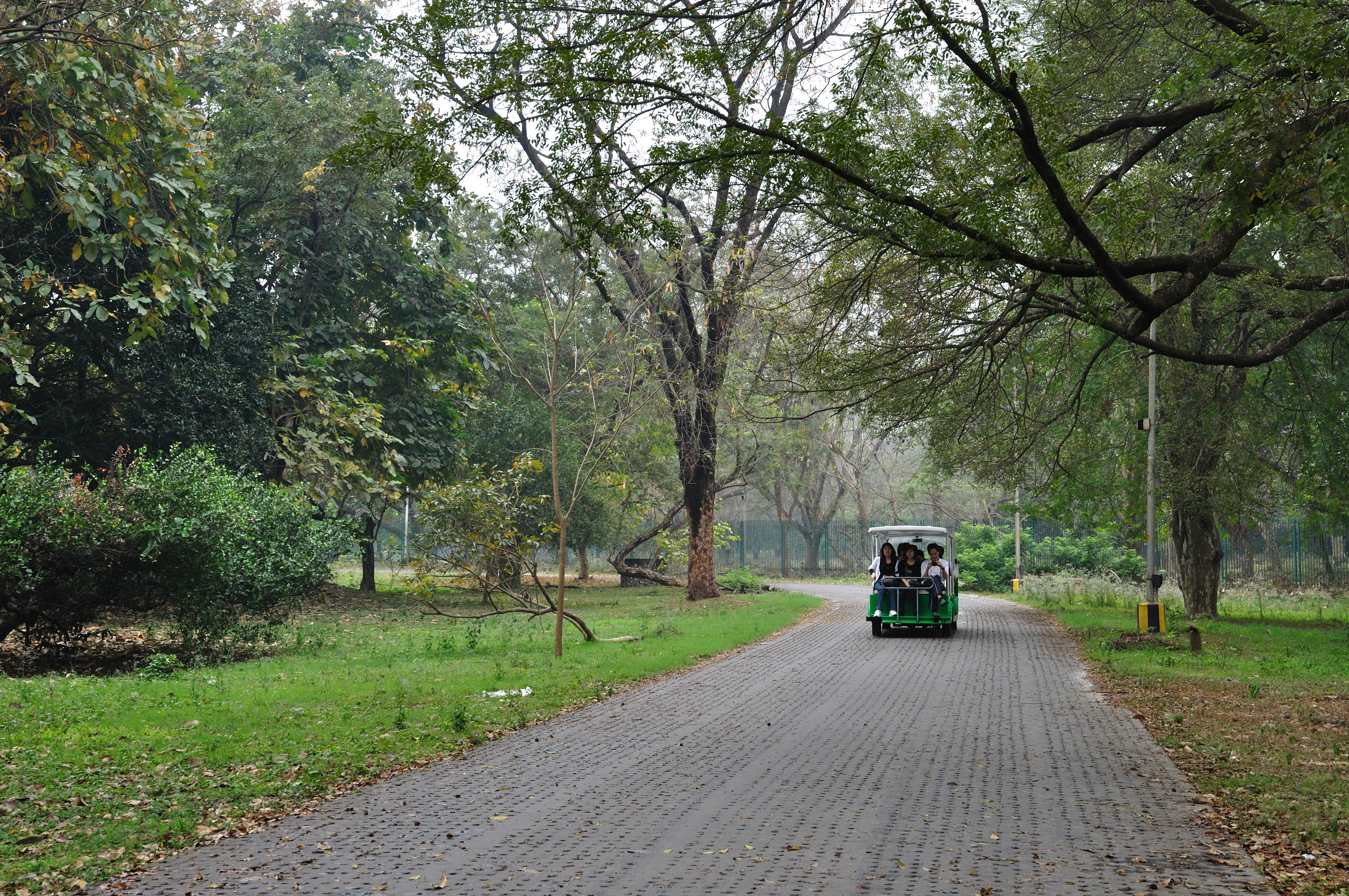
AJC Bose Botanical Garden, Howrah

== Urban Parks ==
=== Large urban parks ===
The list contains urban parks which have area more than 50 Acres.

Name	Location	Area
Maidan	Central Kolkata	1283 Acres (total); 400 Acres(urban green space)
Eco Park	New Town	480 Acres
Rabindra Sarobar	South Kolkata	192 Acres
Central Park	Salt Lake	152 Acres
Subhas Sarobar Park	East Kolkata	73 Acres
Victoria Memorial Gardens	Central Kolkata	64 Acres

=== Small urban parks ===
The list consist small parks, municipality parks or gardens etc.

- Mohor Kunja, Central Kolkata
- Millennium Park, North Kolkata
- Deshapriya Park, South Kolkata
- Elliot Park, Central Kolkata
- Minto Park, Circus Ave
- Vidyasagar Udyan, Hastings
- Safari Park, Gariahat

== Botanical gardens ==
Name	Location	Area
Acharya Jagadish Chandra Bose Indian Botanic Garden	Shibpur, Howrah	270 Acres

== Zoological gardens ==
Name	Location	Area
Zoological Garden, Alipore	Alipore	46 Acres
Harinalaya Mini Zoo	New Town	12.5 Acres
