= City Centre station =

City Centre station or City Center station may refer to any of the following:

- City Center metro station, a Kolkata Metro station in West Bengal, India
- City Centre-2 metro station, a Kolkata Metro station on the Orange Line in West Bengal, India
- City Center station (Utah Transit Authority), a TRAX light rail station in Salt Lake City, United States
- Vancouver City Centre station, a SkyTrain station in Vancouver, Canada
