= Central Park metro station =

Kolkata Metro's Green Line metro station

Central Park
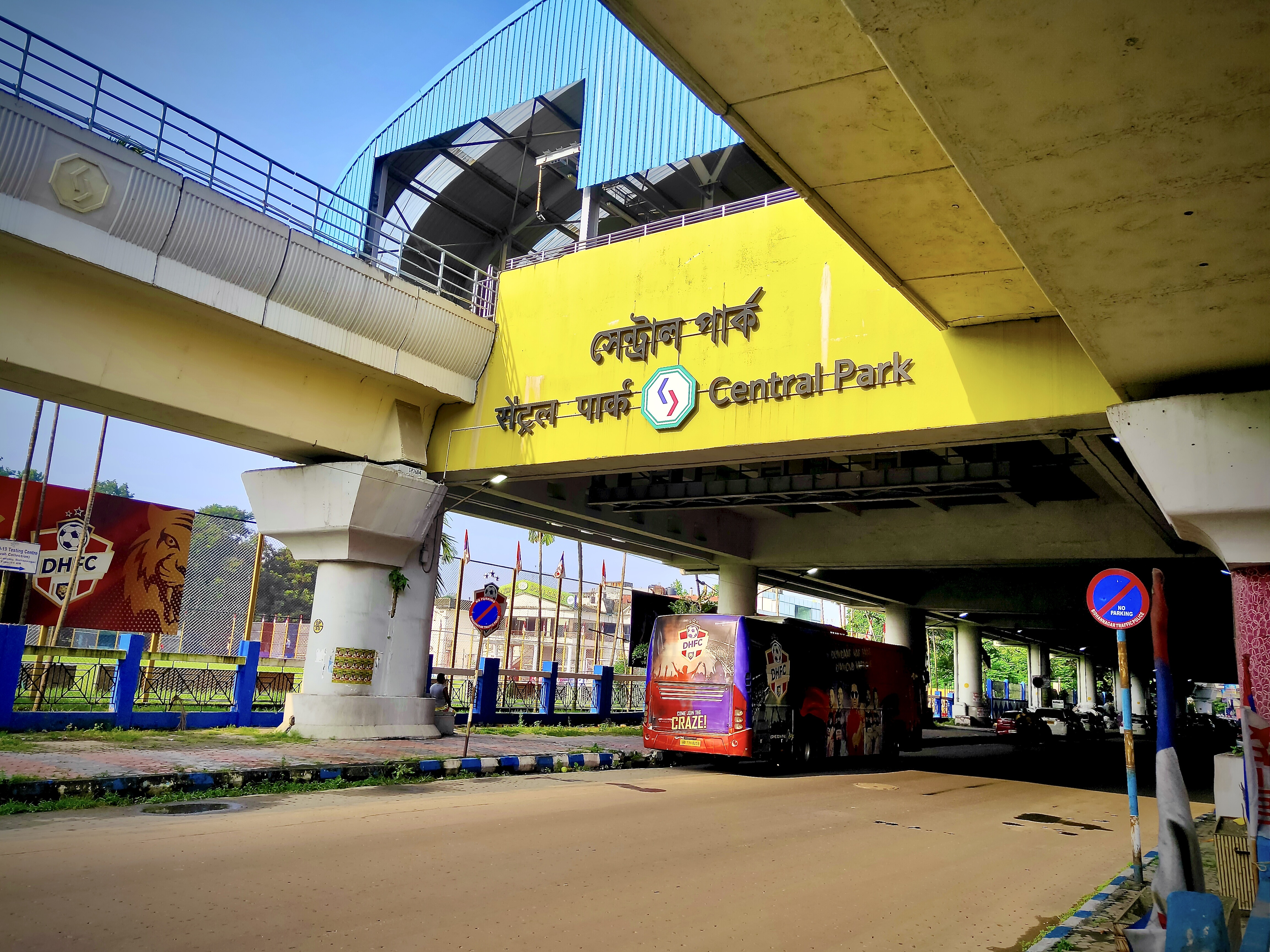
- Station exterior

General information
- Location: DF Block, 3rd Avenue, Sector - I Bidhannagar, North 24 Parganas district West Bengal 700064; India
- Coordinates: 22.59035°N 88.41559°E
- System: Kolkata Metro
- Operator: Metro Railway, Kolkata
- Line: Green Line
- Platforms: 3 (1 island platform;1 side platform)
- Tracks: 3

Construction
- Structure type: Elevated
- Cycle facilities: No
- Accessible: Yes

Other information
- Status: Operational
- Station code: CPSA

History
- Opening: 13 February 2020; 6 years ago

Services
Preceding station	Kolkata Metro	Following station
City Center towards Howrah Maidan	Green Line	Karunamoyee towards Salt Lake Sector-V
Route map
Location

Central Park is an elevated metro station on the East–West corridor of the Green Line of the Kolkata Metro, serving the eastern neighbourhood of Bidhannagar in West Bengal, India. The station is situated above 3rd Avenue, between Central Park and Bikash Bhawan, in Sector I of Salt Lake. It provides access to Central Park, surrounding residential areas, and a cluster of nearby government offices, and is regularly used by commuters, local residents, and visitors travelling within the planned township and to other parts of the Kolkata metropolitan area.

== Station Layout ==
The station layout at Central Park is unusual compared to a typical metro design. Instead of having a separate mezzanine level between street and platforms, the platform and fare control functions are essentially on the same 1st-floor level, so passengers go from ground (G) straight up one level and reach the platforms and ticketing area together. There is no need to pass through an intermediate concourse. For changing sides or crossing the tracks, passengers use the dedicated foot-over-bridge (FOB) that serves as the crossover, rather than an internal mezzanine concourse.

fob	Footover Bridge	Crossover
L1	Platform level	Fare control, station agent, Metro Card vending machines
L1	Side platform, Doors will open on the left
L1	Platform 1	Train towards Salt Lake Sector-V (Karunamoyee) →
L1	Platform 2	← Train towards Howrah Maidan (City Center)
L1	Side platform, Doors will open on the left
L1		← Pocket track towards Central Park depot
G	Street Level	Exit/Entrance

== Connections ==
=== Bus ===
Bus route number 44A, 206, 211B, 215A/1, 239, 260, KB16, KB22, K1, S171 (Mini), S16, S30A etc. serve the station.

=== Air ===
Netaji Subhash Chandra Bose International Airport is 11.4 km (7.1 mi) via VIP Road.

== Gallery ==
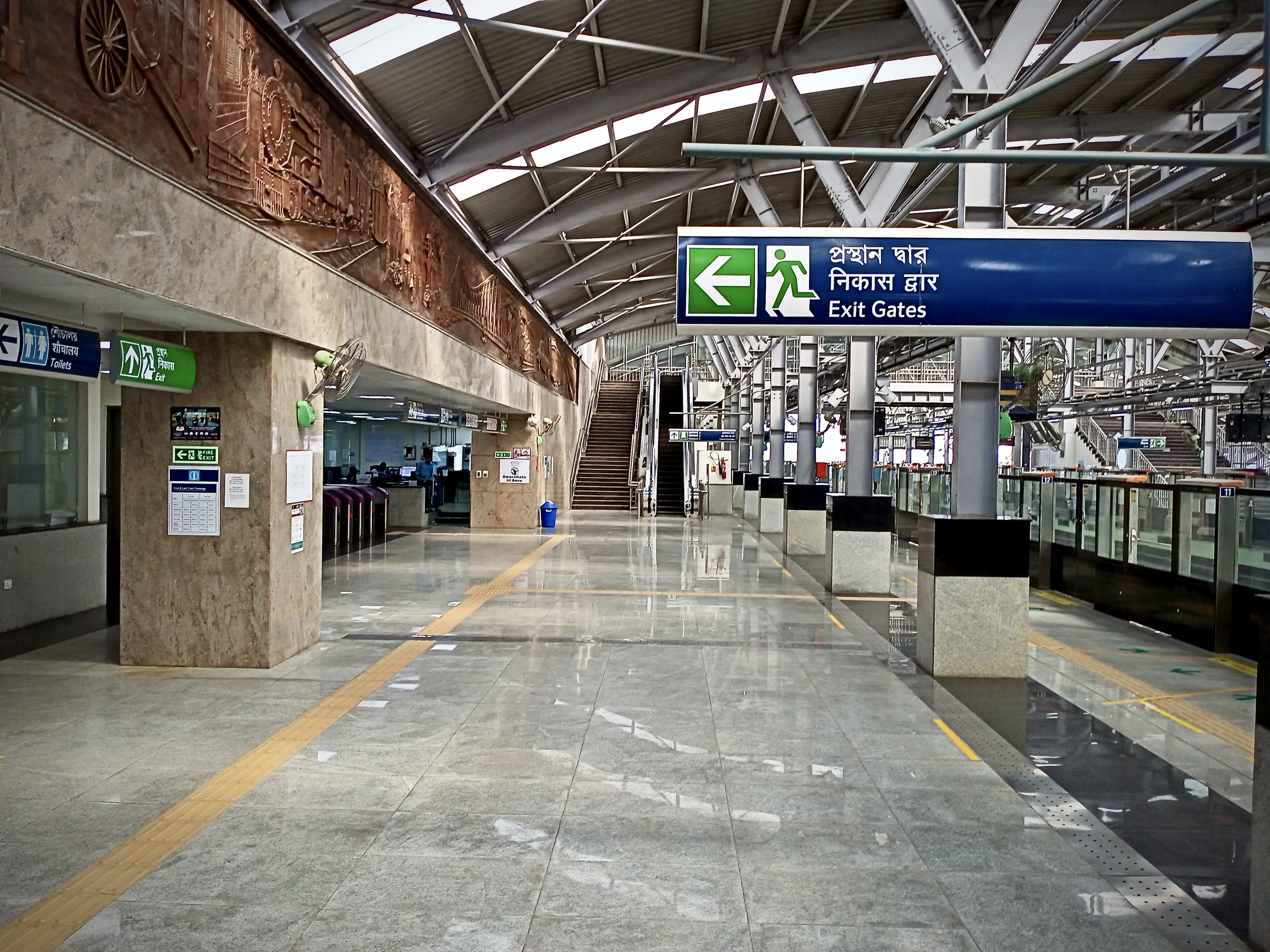
Central Park metro station platform view

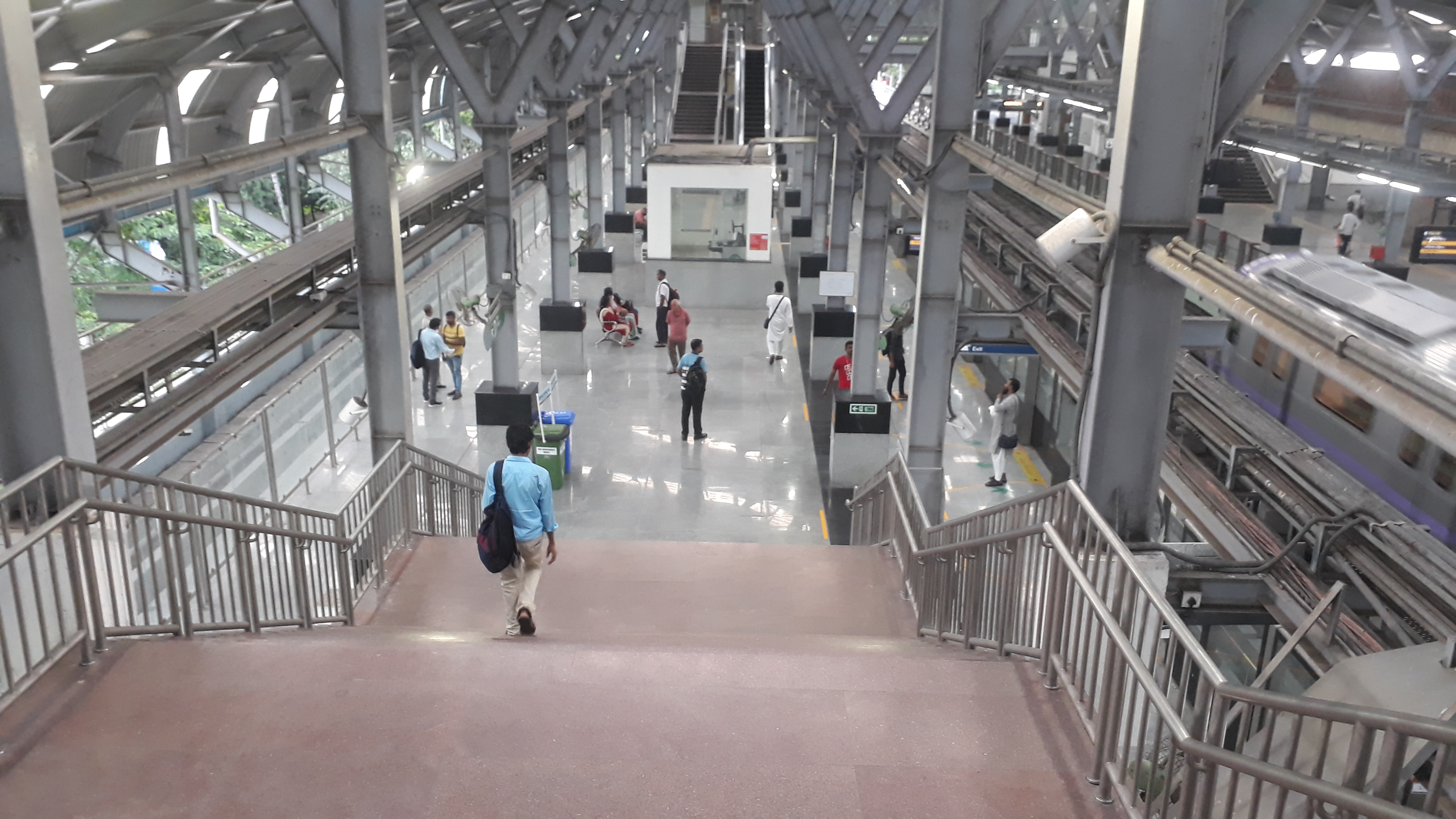
Platforms as viewed from the foot overbridge

Map of Central park depot, Kolkata

== See also ==
- List of Kolkata Metro stations
