= Vidyasagar Udyan =

Park in Kolkata

- বিদ্যাসাগর উদ্যান
- Type: Urban park
- Location: College Street, Kolkata
- Area: Kolkata metropolitan area
- Authorized: 1979
- Operator: Kolkata Municipal Corporation
- Status: Open
- Public transit: Nearest Metro: Central; MG Road; Nearest railway station: Sealdah; Nearest bus stop: College Street

Vidyasagar Udyan is an urban park in Central Kolkata near College Street. Formerly and natively known as "College Square", the park is located along the premises of University of Calcutta, Presidency University and Sanskrit College. The park is famous for its lively student scene around the multiple universities and colleges and contains a big outside swimming pool named "College Square Swimming Pool".

== Premises ==
Vidyasagar Udyan is maintained by Kolkata Municipal Corporation and named after famous Bengali Renaissance icon and educationist Iswar Chandra Vidyasagar. The College Square premises were named after him on 18 September 1979, by Kolkata Municipal Corporation on the presence of Prasanta Kumar Sur, Minister for Local Self-Government, Government of West Bengal. The College Square also contains a Canteen with cheap prices. The canteen attracts mainly students and regular office holders. College Square Swimming Pool is situated inside the premises. The swimming pool is mainly used by "College Square Swimming Club" which was founded in 1917 and recently had its bicentenary celebrations. University students and other clubs also practice their swimming here.

== Popular culture ==
Each year, an event of Durga Puja is performed by the College Square Durga Puja Committee. This puja event is periodically reported to witness heavy footfall during the concerned festival time. College Square Swimming Pool and the park are decorated by lights.

== See also ==
- College Square Swimming Pool
- College Street, Kolkata
- Bidhan Sarani
- University of Calcutta
