= Bengal Chemical metro station =

Kolkata Metro's Green Line metro station

Bengal Chemical
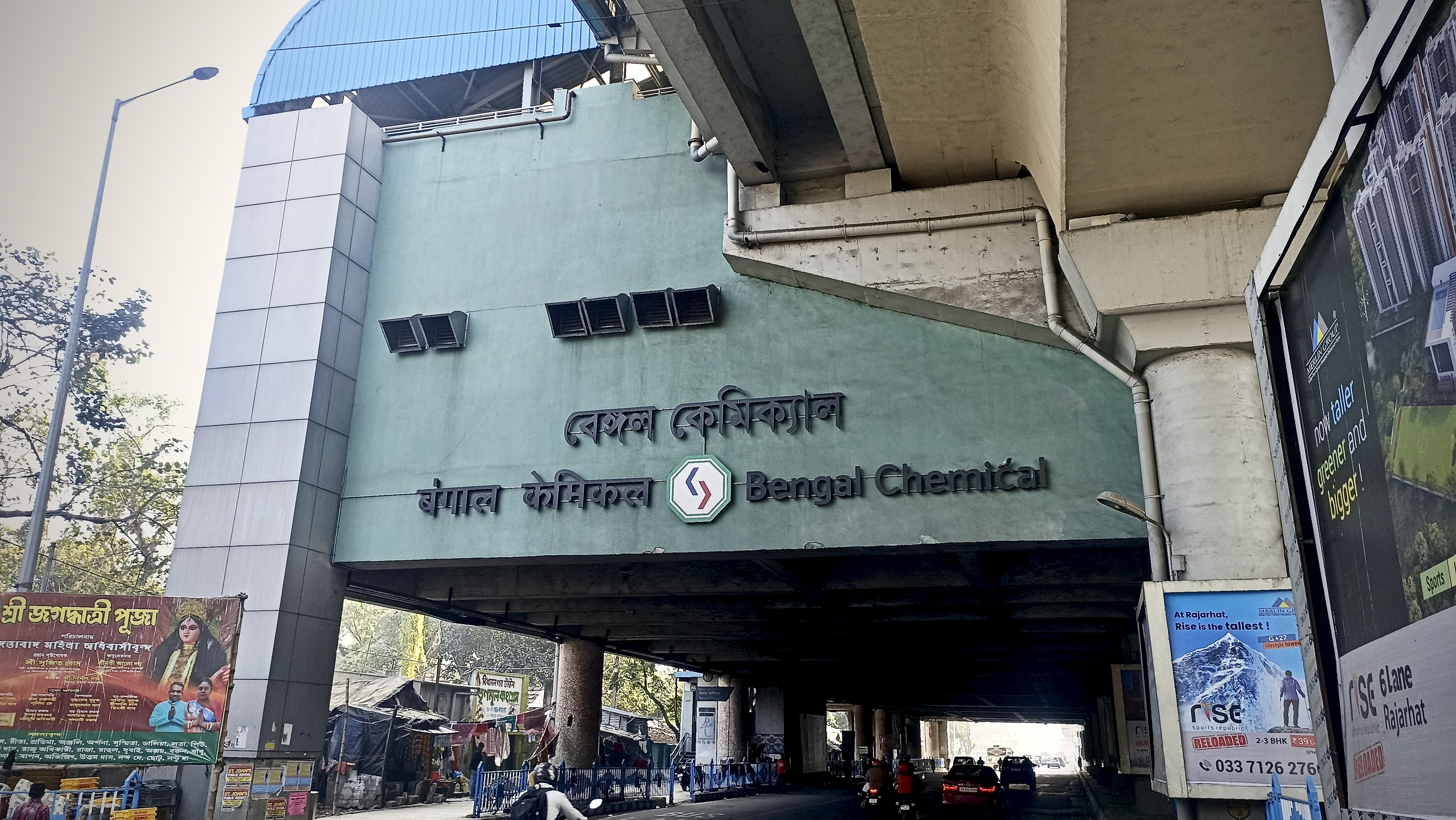

General information
- Other names: Wow Momo Bengal Chemical
- Location: Bengal Chemicals, EM Bypass; Kolkata, West Bengal 700054; India
- Coordinates: 22.58006°N 88.40129°E
- System: Kolkata Metro
- Operated by: Metro Railway, Kolkata
- Line: Green Line
- Platforms: 2 (2 side platforms)

Construction
- Structure type: Elevated
- Accessible: Yes

Other information
- Status: Operational
- Station code: BCSD

History
- Opening: 13 February 2020; 6 years ago

Services
Preceding station	Kolkata Metro	Following station
Salt Lake Stadium towards Howrah Maidan	Green Line	City Center towards Salt Lake Sector-V
Route map
Location

Bengal Chemical (also known as Wow Momo Bengal Chemical for sponsorship reason) is an elevated metro station on the East-West corridor of the Green Line of Kolkata Metro in Kolkata, West Bengal, India. It serves the Duttabad, Kankurgachi and Kadapara area. The structure is situated over EM Bypass, in front of Mani Square, whose linking footover bridge was left incomplete.

== Station Layout ==
L2	Side platform, Doors will open on the left
L2	Platform 1	Towards Salt Lake Sector-V (City Center) →
L2	Platform 2	← Towards Howrah Maidan (Salt Lake Stadium)
L2	Side platform, Doors will open on the left
L1	Concourse	Fare control, station agent, Metro QR ticket vending machines, crossover
G	Street level	Exit/Entrance

== Connections ==
=== Bus ===
Bus route number DN16/1, JM2, 007, C14/1, S4, S21, S37, S37A, AC30S, AC37, AC50, AC50A, V1 etc. serve the station.

=== Air ===
Netaji Subhash Chandra Bose International Airport is 9 km via VIP Road.
