= Salt Lake Stadium metro station =

Kolkata Metro's Green Line metro station

Salt Lake Stadium
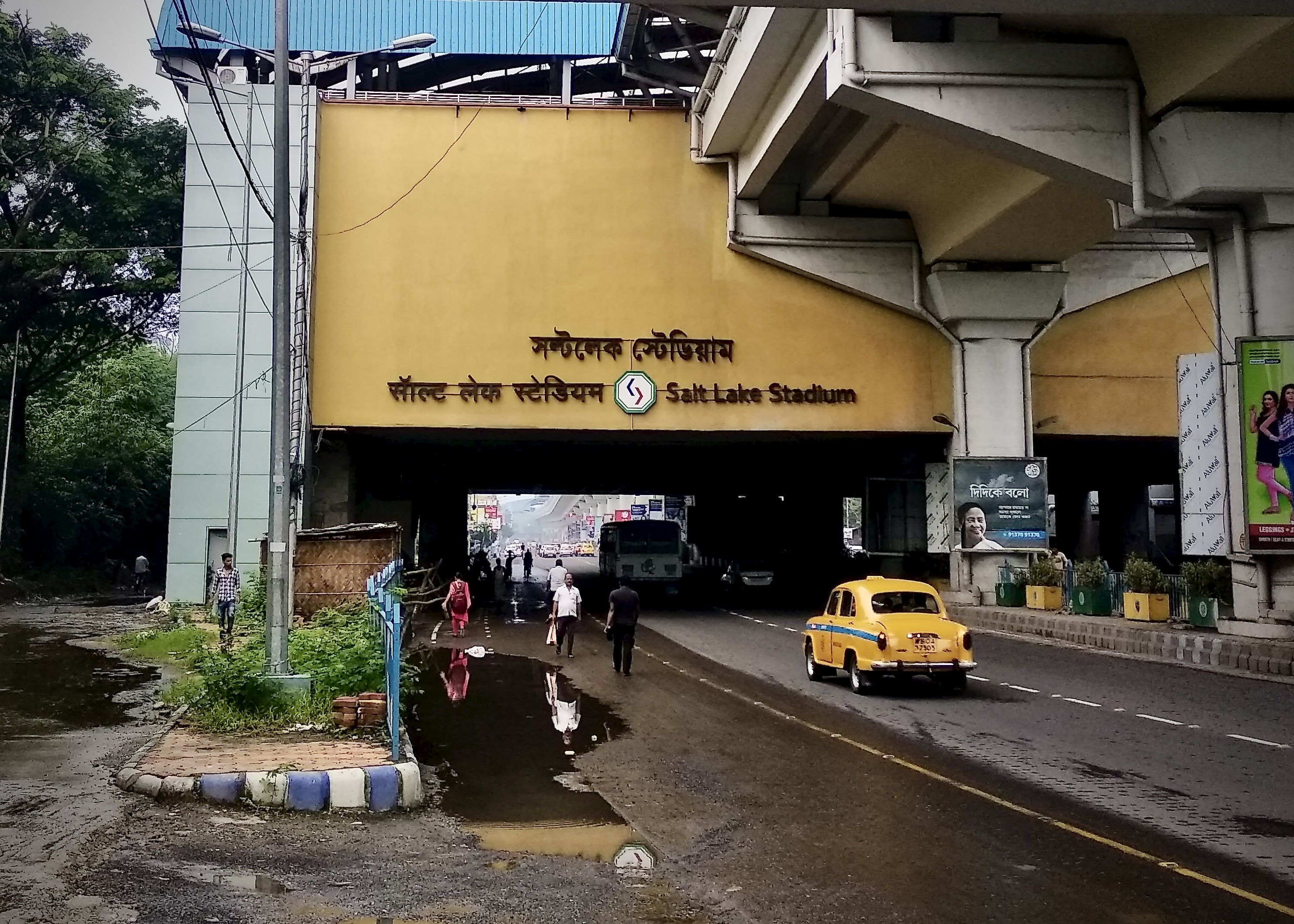

General information
- Other names: IFA Salt Lake Stadium
- Location: EM Bypass, Kadapara; Kolkata, West Bengal 700054; India
- Coordinates: 22.57311°N 88.40308°E
- System: Kolkata Metro
- Operated by: Metro Railway, Kolkata
- Line: Green Line
- Platforms: 2 (2 side platforms)

Construction
- Structure type: Elevated
- Accessible: Yes

Other information
- Status: Operational
- Station code: SSSA

History
- Opened: 13 February 2020; 6 years ago

Services
Preceding station	Kolkata Metro	Following station
Phoolbagan towards Howrah Maidan	Green Line	Bengal Chemical towards Salt Lake Sector-V
Route map
Location

Salt Lake Stadium (also known as IFA Salt Lake Stadium) is an elevated metro station on the east–west corridor of the Green Line of Kolkata Metro in Kolkata, West Bengal, India. It serves the Vivekananda Yuba Bharati Krirangan and Kadapara area. The station is situated over EM Bypass, 800 m away from the Bengal Chemical metro station.

== The station ==
This is the last elevated station on this line. After this, the line bends almost 90° and enters into the tunnel beside Subhas Sarobar.

=== Layout ===
L2	Side platform, Doors will open on the left
L2	Platform 1	Towards Salt Lake Sector-V (Bengal Chemical) →
L2	Platform 2	← Towards Howrah Maidan (Phoolbagan)
L2	Side platform, Doors will open on the left
L1	Concourse	Fare control, station agent, Metro QR ticket vending machines, crossover
G	Street level	Exit/Entrance
