= City Center metro station =

Kolkata Metro's Green Line metro station

City Center
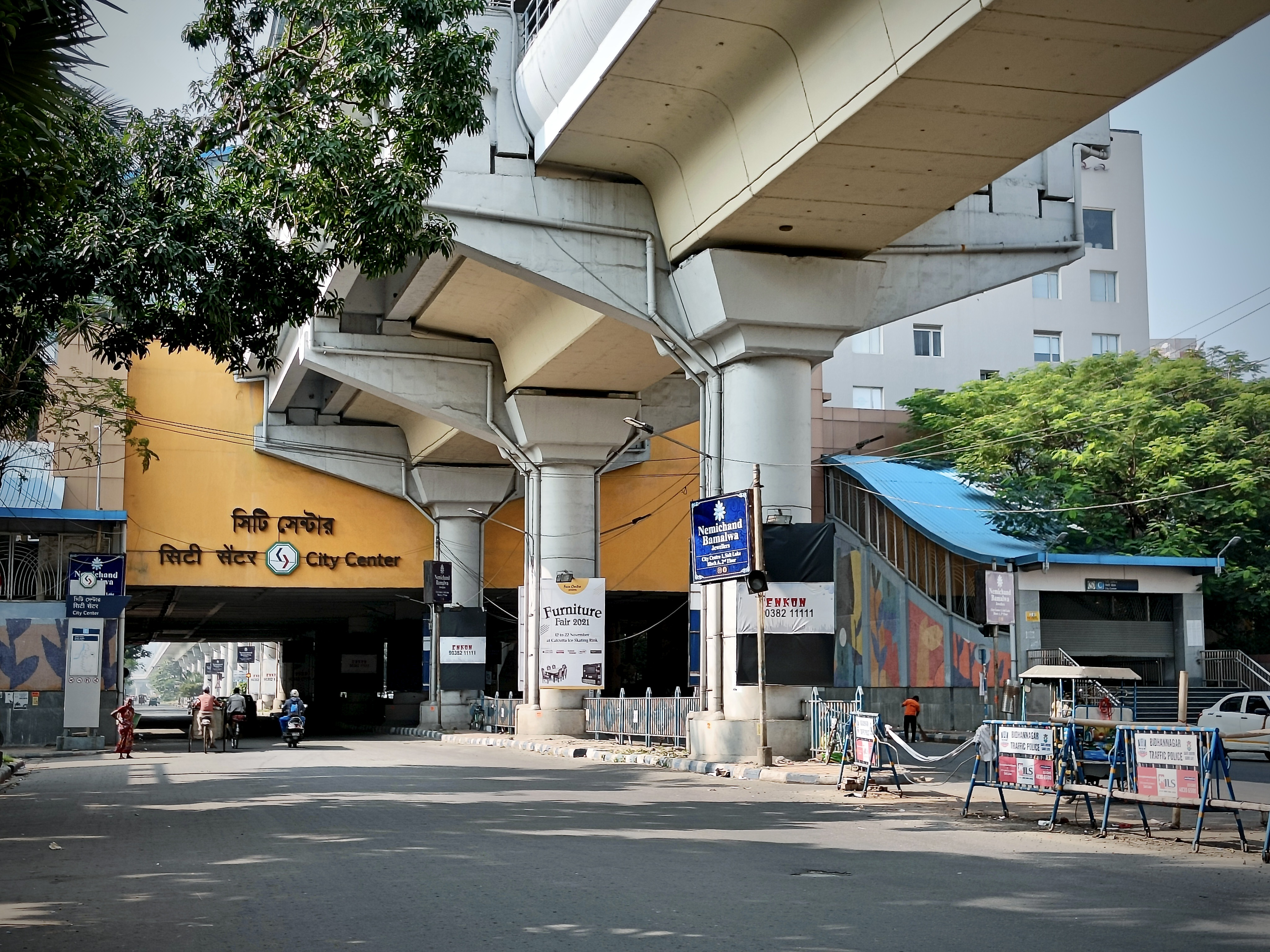

General information
- Location: EC Block, 3rd Avenue, Sector - I Bidhannagar, North 24 Parganas district West Bengal 700064; India
- Coordinates: 22.58706°N 88.40782°E
- System: Kolkata Metro
- Operated by: Metro Railway, Kolkata
- Line: Green Line
- Platforms: 2 (2 side platforms)
- Tracks: 2

Construction
- Structure type: Elevated
- Accessible: Yes

Other information
- Status: Operational
- Station code: CCSC

History
- Opening: 13 February 2020; 6 years ago

Services
Preceding station	Kolkata Metro	Following station
Bengal Chemical towards Howrah Maidan	Green Line	Central Park towards Salt Lake Sector-V
Route map
Location

City Center (also known as LIC City Center for sponsorship reasons) is an elevated metro station on the east-west corridor of the Green Line of Kolkata Metro that serves the City Center shopping mall area in Bidhannagar, West Bengal, India. This metro station is located near Labony Estate, Salt Lake.

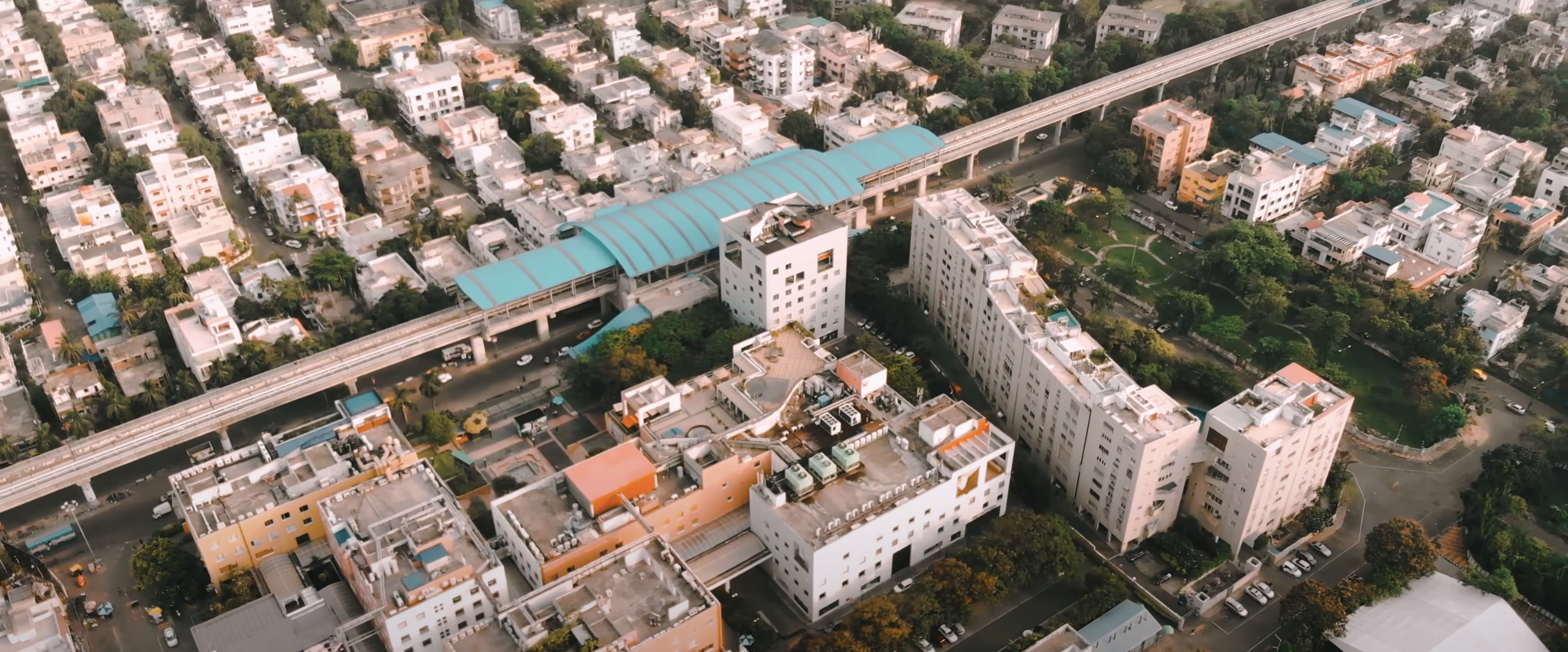
Salt Lake City Centre Metro Station under construction in June 2018

== Station Layout ==
L2	Side platform, Doors will open on the left
L2	Platform 1	Train towards Salt Lake Sector-V (Central Park) →
L2	Platform 2	← Train towards Howrah Maidan (Bengal Chemical)
L2	Side platform, Doors will open on the left
L1	Concourse	Fare control, station agent, Metro QR ticket vending machines, crossover
G	Street level	Exit/Entrance

== Connections ==
=== Bus ===
Bus route number 44A, 206, 211B, 215A/1, 260, KB16, KB22, K1, S171 (Mini), S16, S30A, S60 etc. serve the station.

=== Air ===
Netaji Subhash Chandra Bose International Airport is 10.4 km via VIP Road.
