= Mohor Kunja =

Urban Park in Kolkata, India

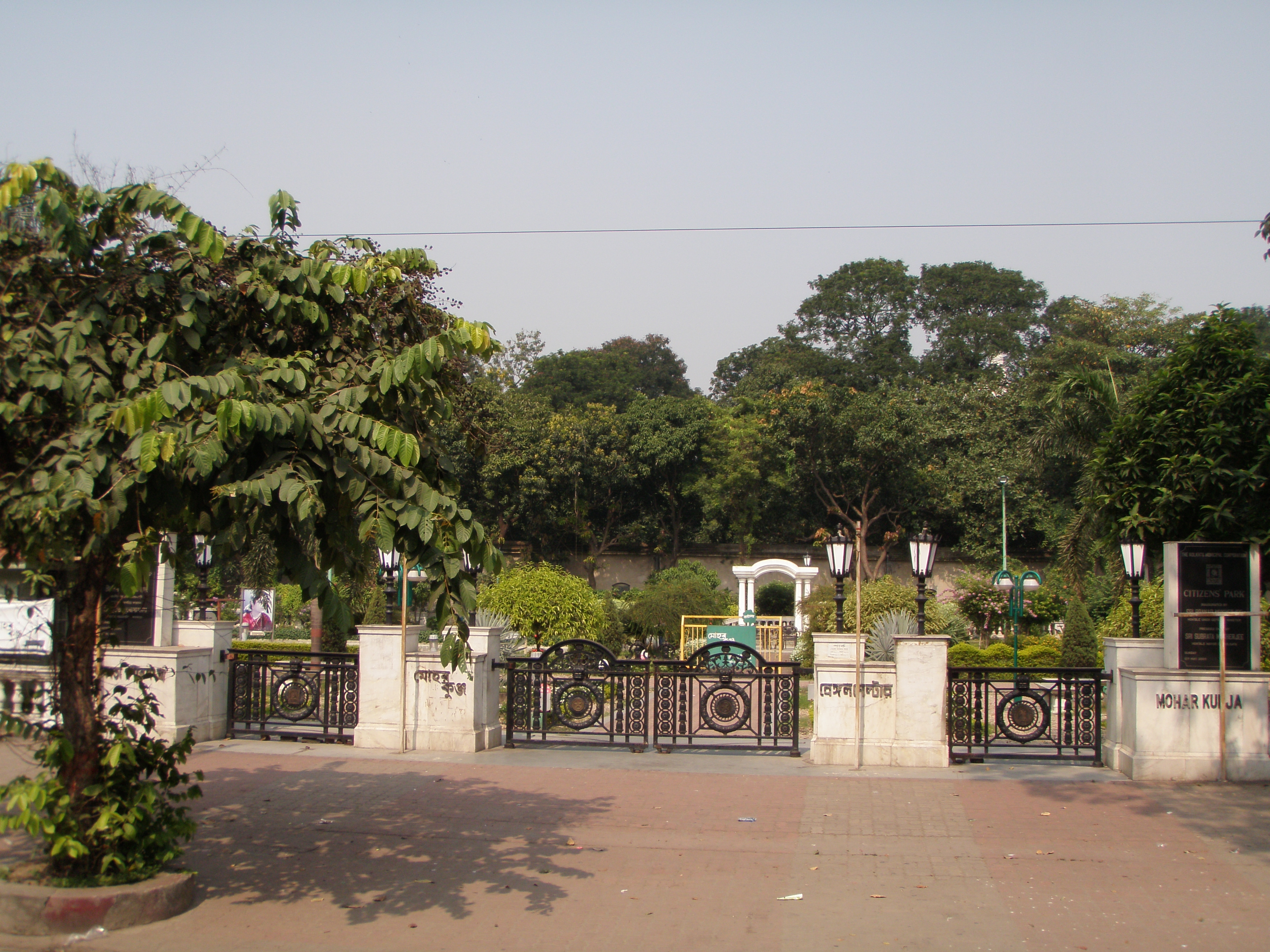
- Entrance of Mohor Kunja

- Location within Kolkata Location within West Bengal Location within India
- Type: Public
- Location: Kolkata
- Coordinates: 22.5449°N 88.3425°E
- Status: open

Mohor Kunja (earlier Citizen's Park) is a public urban park in Maidan, Kolkata. The park is located on Cathedral Road by the side of Victoria Memorial and opposite Nandan. The Park was opened as Citizen's Park. In 2007, the Park was renamed by Bikash Ranjan Bhattacharya, then Mayor of Kolkata as Mohor Kunja to honour Rabindra Sangeet expert Kanika Bandopadhyay, who is popularly known as Mohor-di. The construction cost of the park was Rupees 64 Lakhs. The park is known for its musical fountains. The park also provides an open-air stage for cultural events.
