= College Square Swimming Pool =

Swimming Pool in Kolkata, India

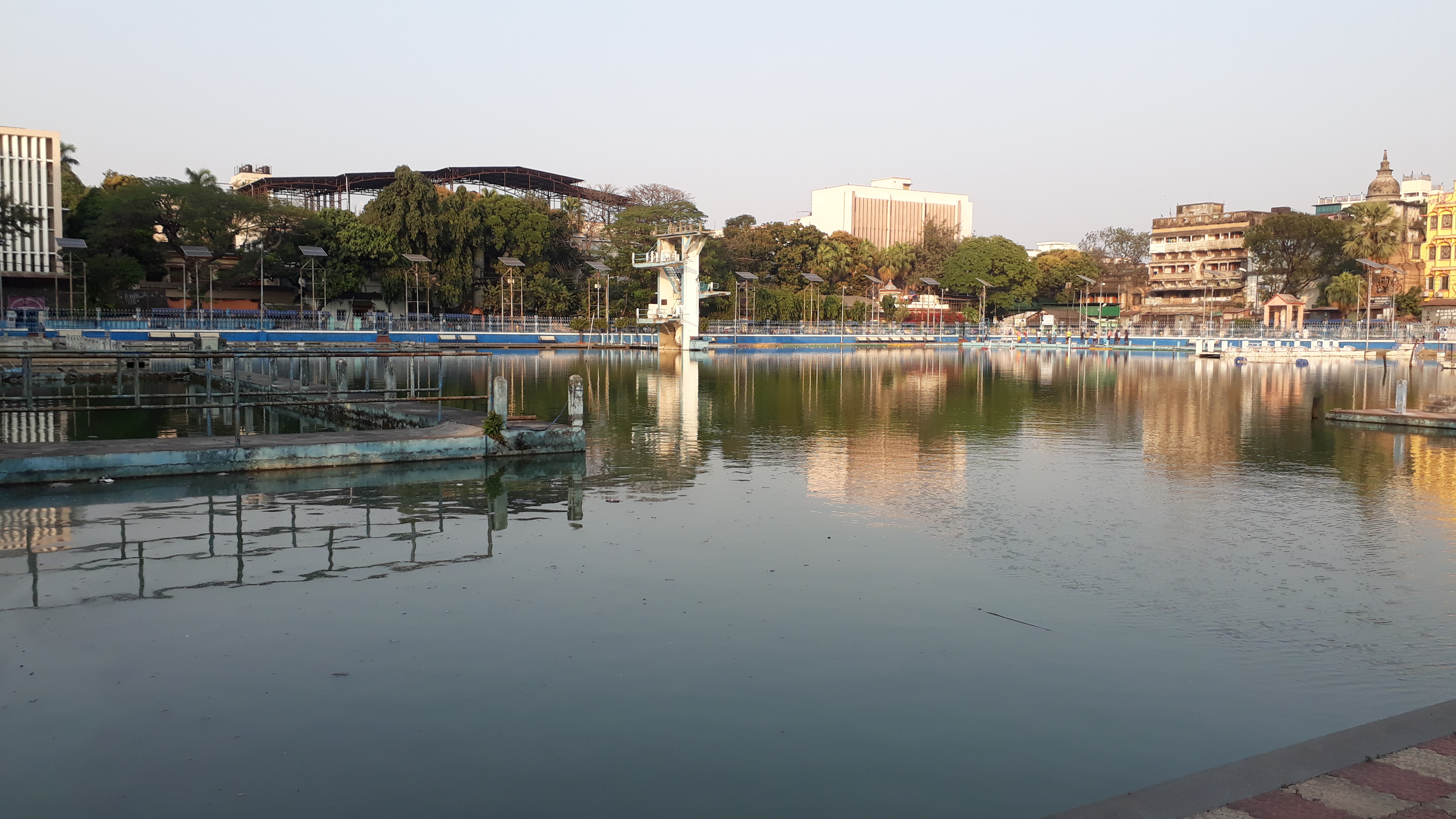
- College Square Swimming Pool
- Interactive map of College Square Swimming Pool
- Maintained by: Kolkata Municipal Corporation
- Location: Kolkata, India
- Postal code: 700073
- Nearest Kolkata Metro station: MG Road, Central and Sealdah(under construction)
- Coordinates: 22.5747°N 88.3639°E
- From: College Square

College Square Swimming Pool is a swimming pool arena of Kolkata maintained by Kolkata Municipal Corporation. It is situated at College Street area adjacent to Hindu School and Surya Sen Street.

== History ==
The first swimming club to be constructed in this pool arena was College Square Swimming Club in the year 1927 by a group of sports enthusiasts of Kolkata, led by Pramoth Nath Ghosh. Several Olympians have been part of the College Square Swimming Club.

== Organization ==
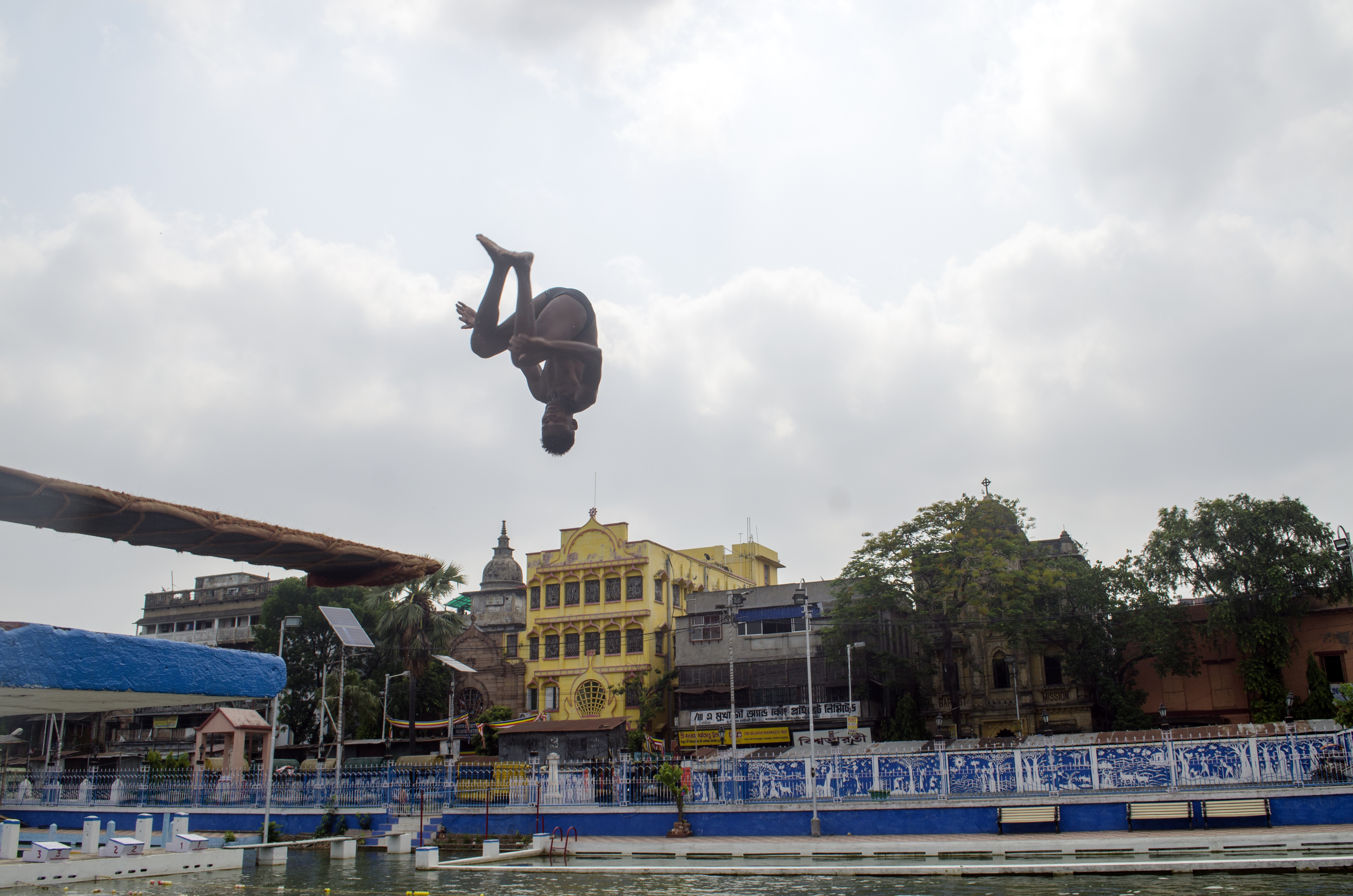
Diving at College Square Swimming Pool

Though the swimming pool is administered by the Municipality Corporation, it is allowed to be used by six swimming clubs namely College Square Swimming Club, Bowbazaar Bayam Samity, Self Culture Institute, YMCA Swimming Club, Sailendra Memorial Club, The Calcutta University Institute (Swimming Section).

== Swimming culture ==
It is one of the oldest swimming pools of Kolkata other than the aquatic pool of Calcutta Swimming Club while having one of the oldest swimming clubs of Kolkata - College Square Swimming Club situated within its arena. This swimming pool is found to have considerable contribution towards history of aquatic culture of Kolkata.

== Accidents and controversies ==
In August 2017, a veteran swimming trainer Kajal Dutta drowned in the concerned swimming pool. In spite of being swimming pool in nature, there was reported to be many unplanned structures underwater which was claimed to be formed in unauthorized manner. Such unsafe structures were blamed to be the reason for the death of the veteran swimming coach.

In August 2019, a novice swimmer trainee of Calcutta University Institute Swimming Section drowned at the swimming pool. Kolkata Municipal Corporation closed the entire swimming pool for about seven days post such tragic incidence.

== Religious festivity and popular culture ==
Each year, an event of Durga Puja is undertaken within the arena of the swimming pool and its adjoining area. This puja event is periodically reported to witness heavy footfall during the concerned festival time. During this festivity time, all aquatic activities are kept suspended.

== College Square Swimming Club ==
College Square Swimming Club is one of the swimming clubs at College Square Swimming Pool (also known as Vidyasagar Udyan). The club trains people in aquatic sports including swimming, diving and water polo. Its situated at the north east corner of the swimming pool arena.

=== History ===
The Swimming club was situated in the year 1917 by a group of swimming enthusiasts of Calcutta (now Kolkata) while Pramotho Nath Ghosh leaded them and the same was the founder Secretary of the club. Advocate General of that time Satish Ranjan Das (MLC) was the first president of the club.

=== Notable swimmers ===
During the time, the club has reportedly produced many swimming talents a handful of them were Olympians

- Dwarka Das Muljee (Olympian Swimming 1923)
- Durga Das (Olympian Water Polo 1948)
- Kedar Shaw (Olympian Water Polo 1952)
- Shambhu Saha (Olympian Water Polo 1952)
- Bijoy Barman (Olympian Swimming &Water Polo 1952)
- Amrita Das(Crossed English Channel)
