= Subhas Sarobar =

Lake in India

Coordinates: 22°34′07″N 88°24′03″E

Subhas Sarobar is a large artificial lake and public recreational area located in the eastern part of Kolkata, West Bengal, India. Also known locally as Beliaghata Lake, it is one of the city's prominent water bodies and green spaces. The lake is named after Subhas Chandra Bose, a prominent leader in the Indian independence movement.

The lake complex covers approximately 73 acres, including the water body and the surrounding parkland. It is maintained by the Kolkata Metropolitan Development Authority (KMDA)

The lake is a popular spot for morning walkers, joggers, and nature enthusiasts. It also serves as a site for various cultural and religious activities, including Chhath Puja, attracting thousands of devotees annually.

== Location ==
Subhas Sarobar is situated in the Beliaghata area, adjacent to EM Bypass, a major thoroughfare in Kolkata.

== History ==
Originally a natural depression, the area was developed into an artificial lake during the post-independence era (50s) to improve urban infrastructure and create recreational spaces. It was later named Subhas Sarobar in honor of Netaji Subhas Chandra Bose.

Over the years, the lake and its surroundings have undergone beautification and ecological restoration efforts by KMDA and other civic bodies to improve water quality and enhance biodiversity.

== Features ==
- Walking Tracks: Well-paved paths around the lake are used by local residents for walking and jogging.
- Boating: Though not as prominent as Rabindra Sarobar, some boating facilities have existed periodically.
- Gardens and open spaces: Landscaped gardens and seating areas make it a popular spot for families and picnickers.
- Bird Watching: The lake attracts various migratory and resident bird species.
- Religious functions: The lake is an important site for festivals like Chhath Puja.

== Environmental concerns ==
Like many urban water bodies in India, Subhas Sarobar suffers from pollution, encroachments, and lack of maintenance. Several restoration initiatives have been undertaken, including desilting, aeration, and community engagement programs.

== Accessibility ==
The lake is easily accessible via EM Bypass, and the nearest metro station is Salt Lake Stadium. Multiple bus routes also serve the area.

== In popular culture ==
While Subhas Sarobar is not as widely referenced in literature or cinema as Rabindra Sarobar, it has appeared in local news and photography projects as a symbol of urban serenity amid the chaos of Kolkata.

== See also ==
- List of lakes in India
- Kolkata Metropolitan Development Authority
- Salt Lake Stadium metro station
- Kolkata Metro
