= Central Park (Kolkata) =

Public park in West Bengal, India

- Banabitan
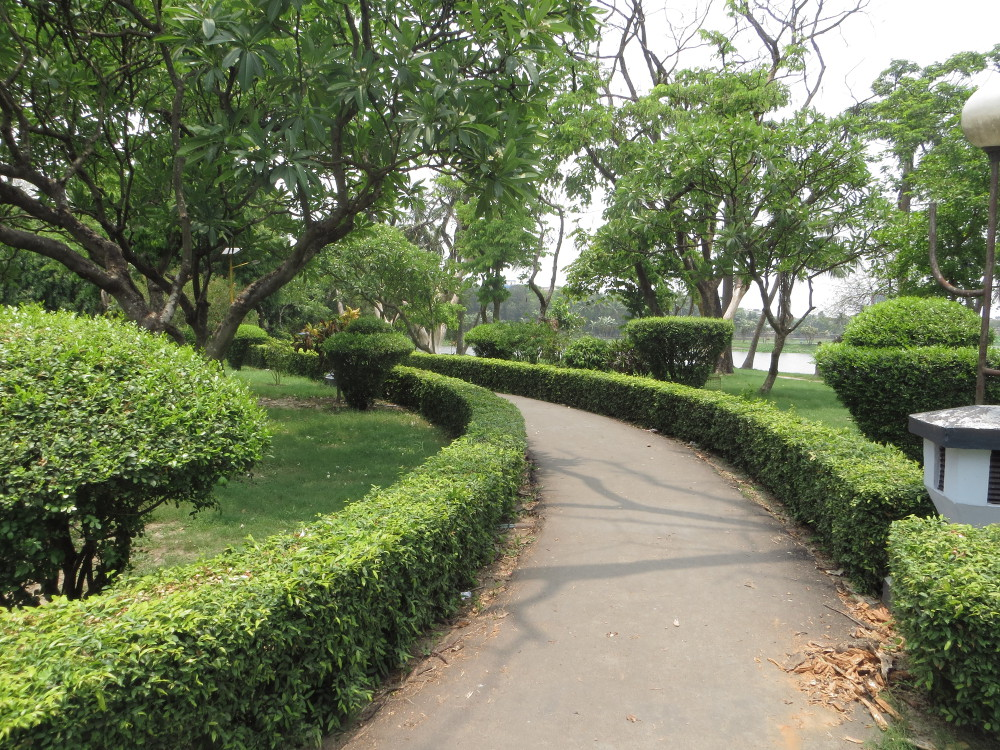
- Main walking track

- Location within Kolkata Location within West Bengal Location within India
- Type: Public
- Location: Bidhannagar, Kolkata
- Coordinates: 22.5870449°N 88.4159125°E
- Area: 152 Acres
- Status: open

Central Park situated in Salt Lake is a public urban park. It is also known as Banabitan. It is the third largest open space in Kolkata Metropolitan Area after the Maidan and Eco Park. This park is easily reachable from the Karunamoyee Bus Terminus in Salt Lake. Central Park metro station and depot of Green Line are located here. On the roads surrounding the park are the buildings where the West Bengal government has relocated many government departments.

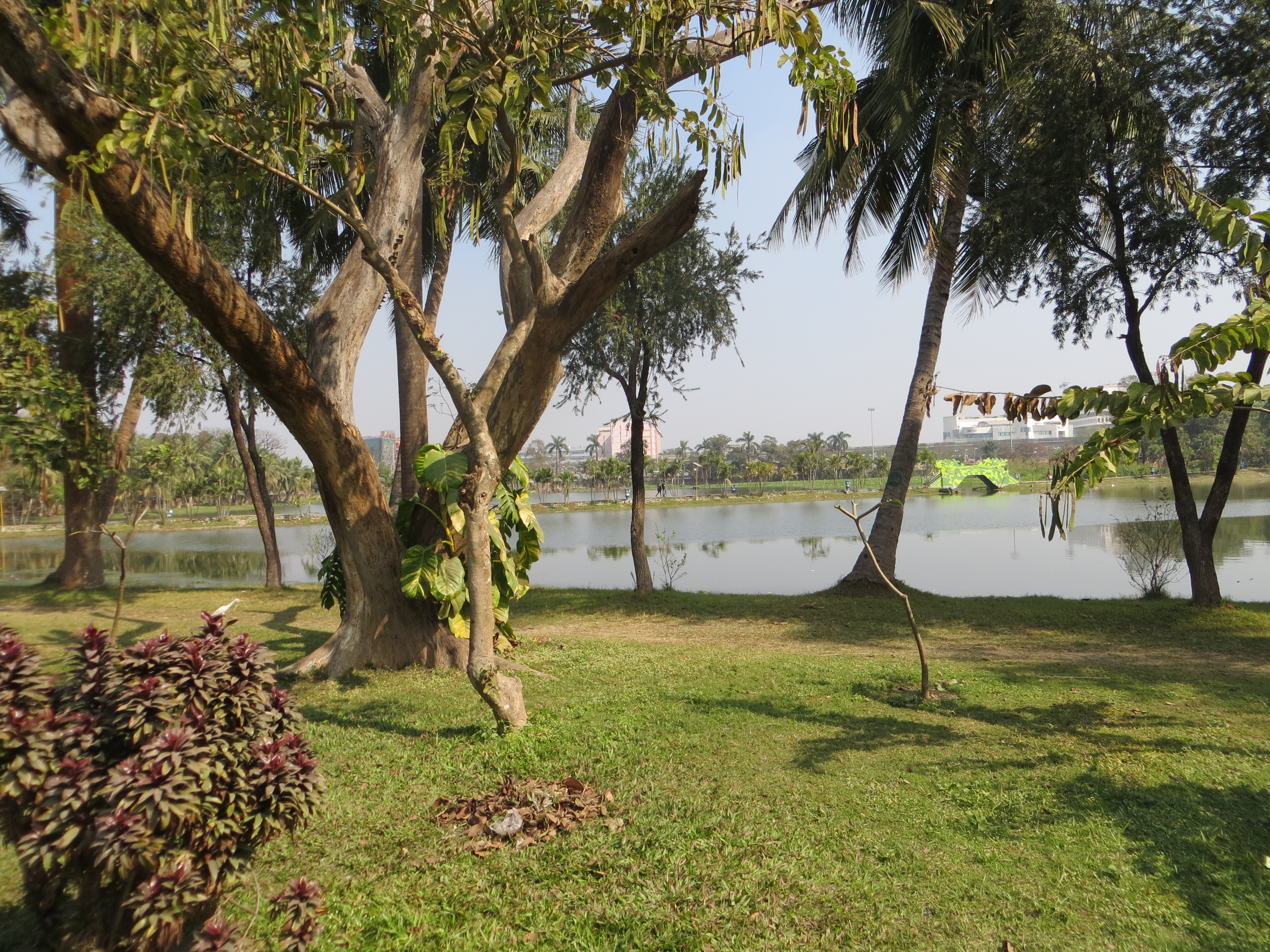
View of the lake side

The park is built around an expansive water body. There is a bridge which connects on side of the lake to an island which has a pagoda. The lake serves as a haven for water birds like lesser whistling duck, common moorhen, white-breasted waterhen, rufous treepie, cattle egret, cormorants and other species. There are also boating facilities in a cordoned off section of the lake near the rose garden.

The park has a rose garden (near Gate No.1, opposite of Bikash Bhawan). The rose garden is bordered by rows of hedges surrounding the rose plants. When in bloom, the rose flowers present a delightful sight.

The park's butterfly garden has several species of butterflies. The butterfly garden consists of several plots where shrubs and trees on which butterflies and their larvae (caterpillar) feed, have been planted. Dedicated gardeners maintain these areas under the guidance of Nature Mates - Nature Club. The West Bengal Forest Dept. supports this initiative. The butterfly garden can be easily reached after entering the park from Gate No.1 and then taking a right from the main walking track.

== Central Park Metro Depot ==
Almost half of the Central Park was torn down to build a metro depot and car shed to serve Kolkata's most ambitious metro corridor, the Green Line. The depot has been operational since 2018. The depot adjoins Central Park metro station.

== Banabitan Biodiversity Park ==
The Central Park is officially known as Banabitan Biodiversity Park. This park is maintained by West Bengal Forest Department. The park has two large waterbodies.

== Gallery ==
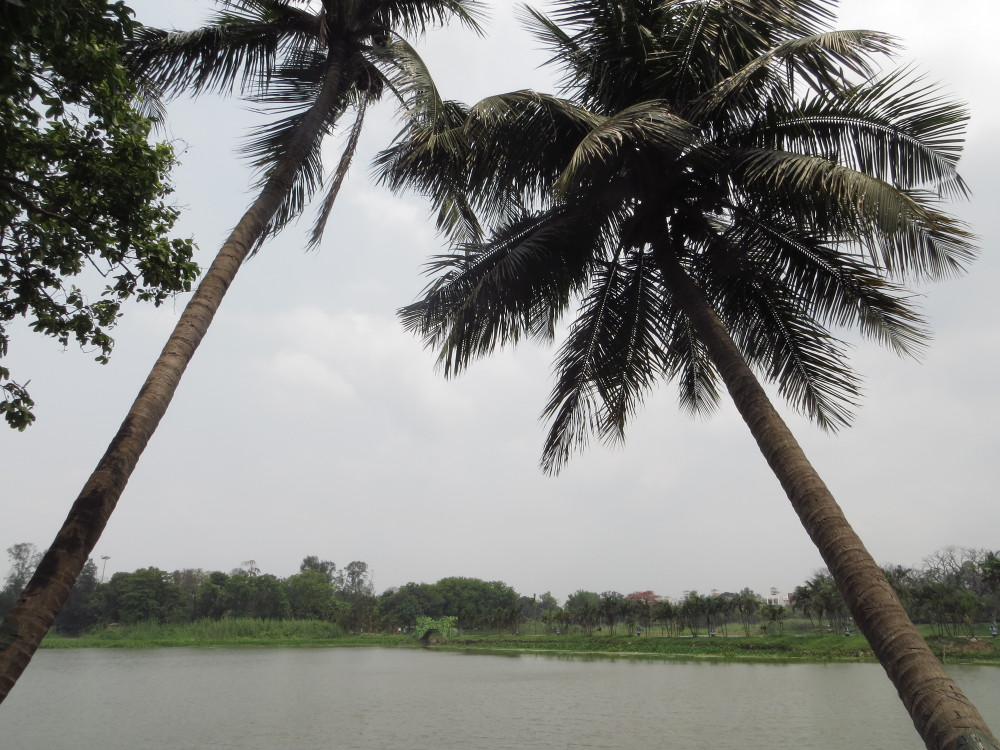
A view of the lake

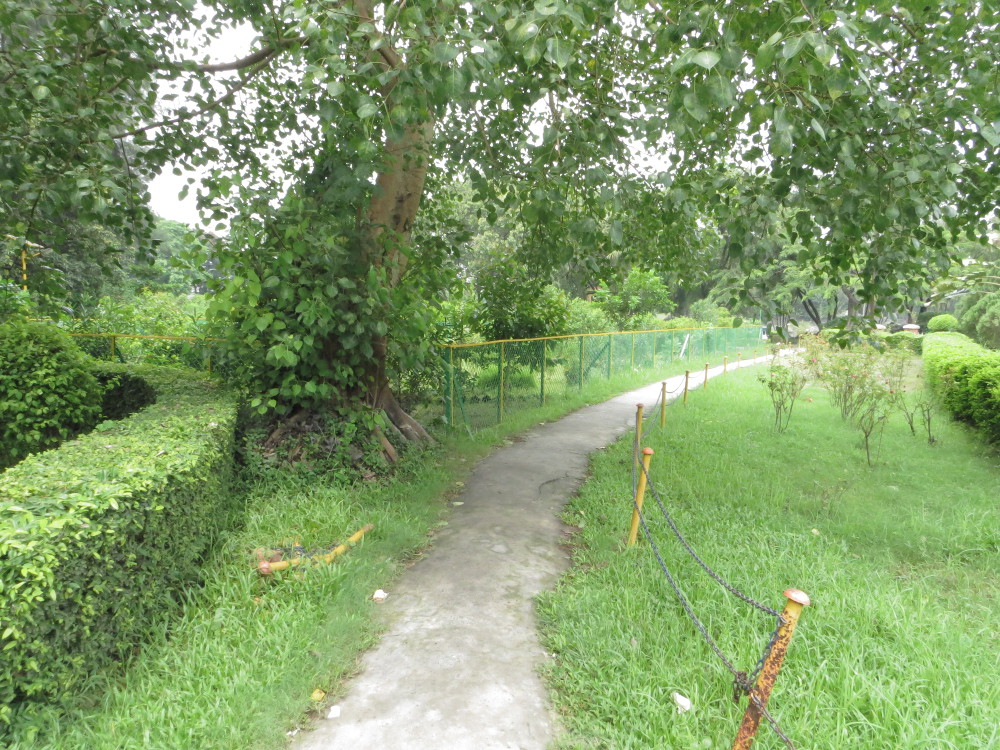
Path leading into the butterfly garden area

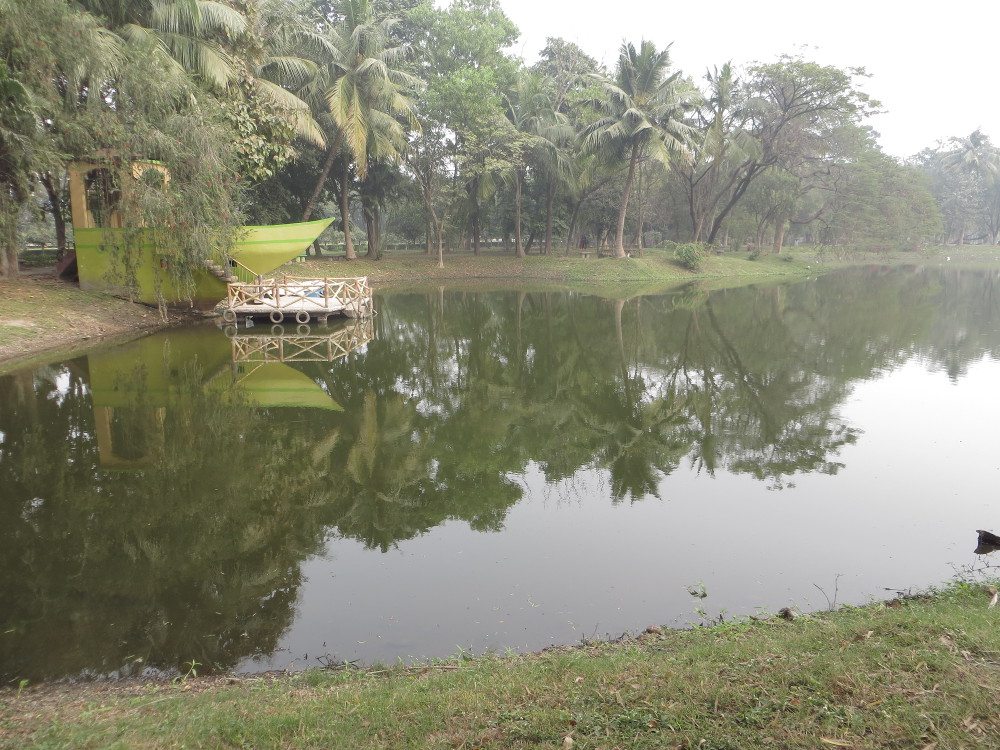
Boating area

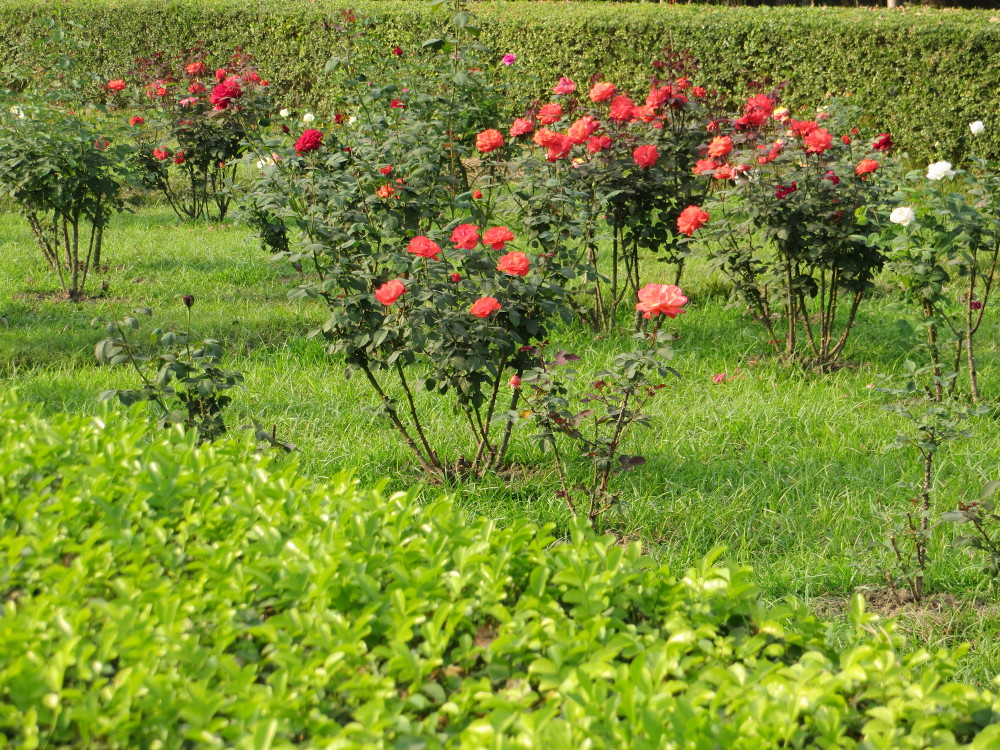
Roses in bloom in the park's rose garden

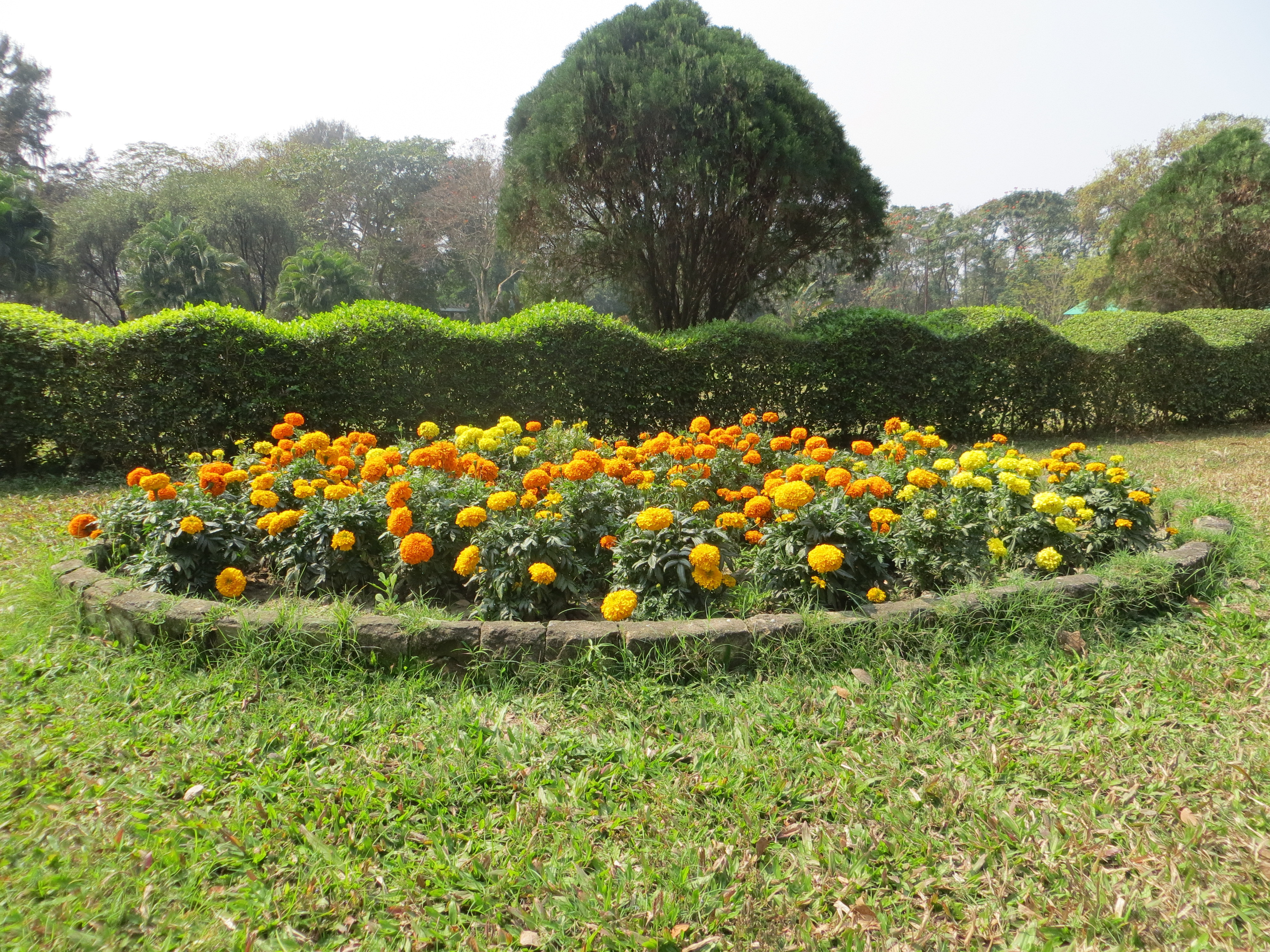
Marigold flowers

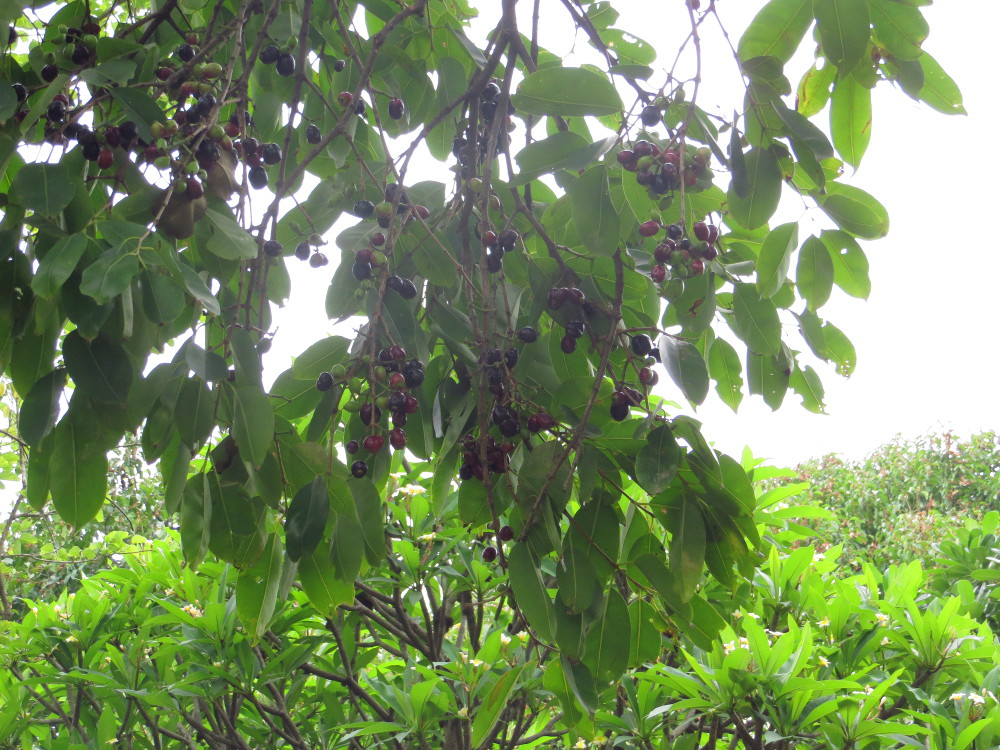
Ripe jamun fruits

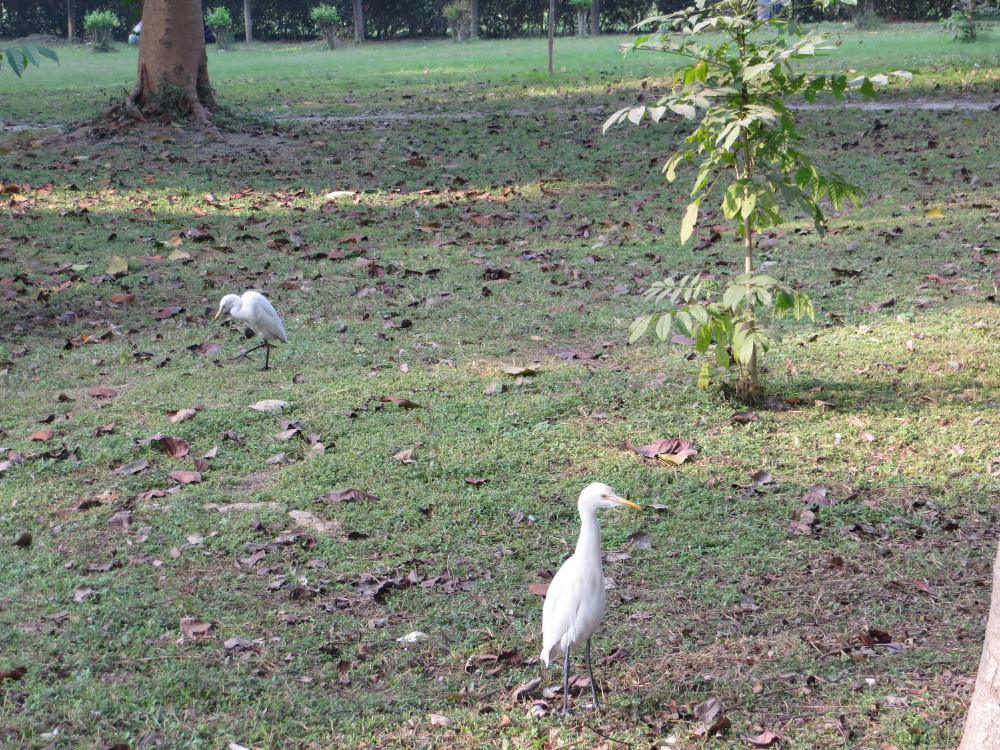
Cattle egrets

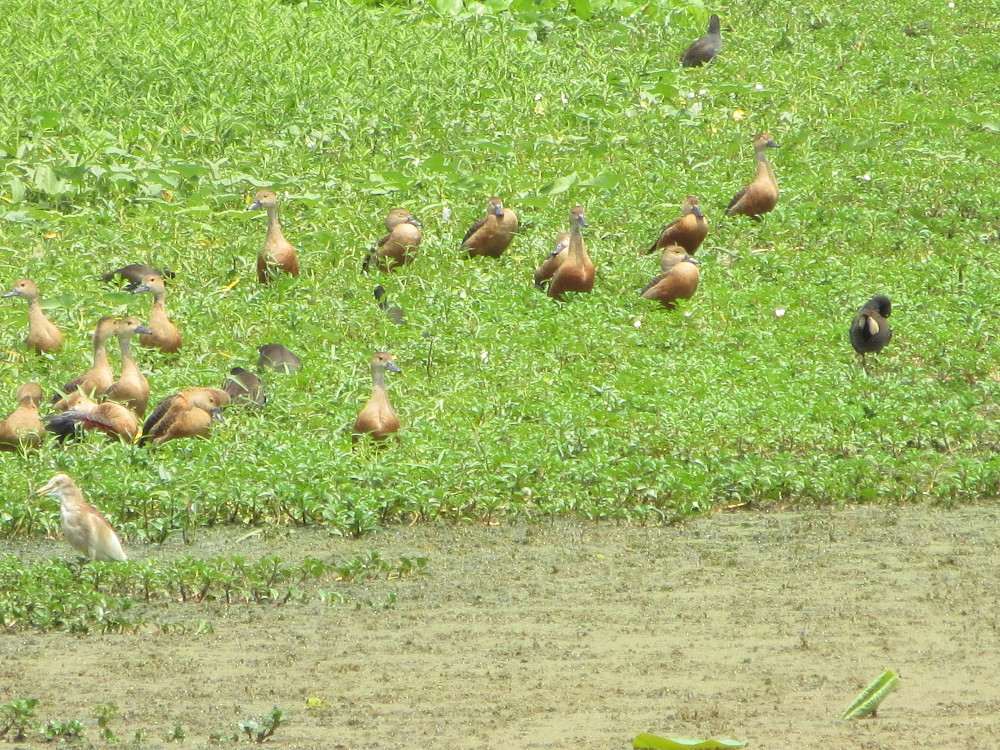
Lesser whistling ducks

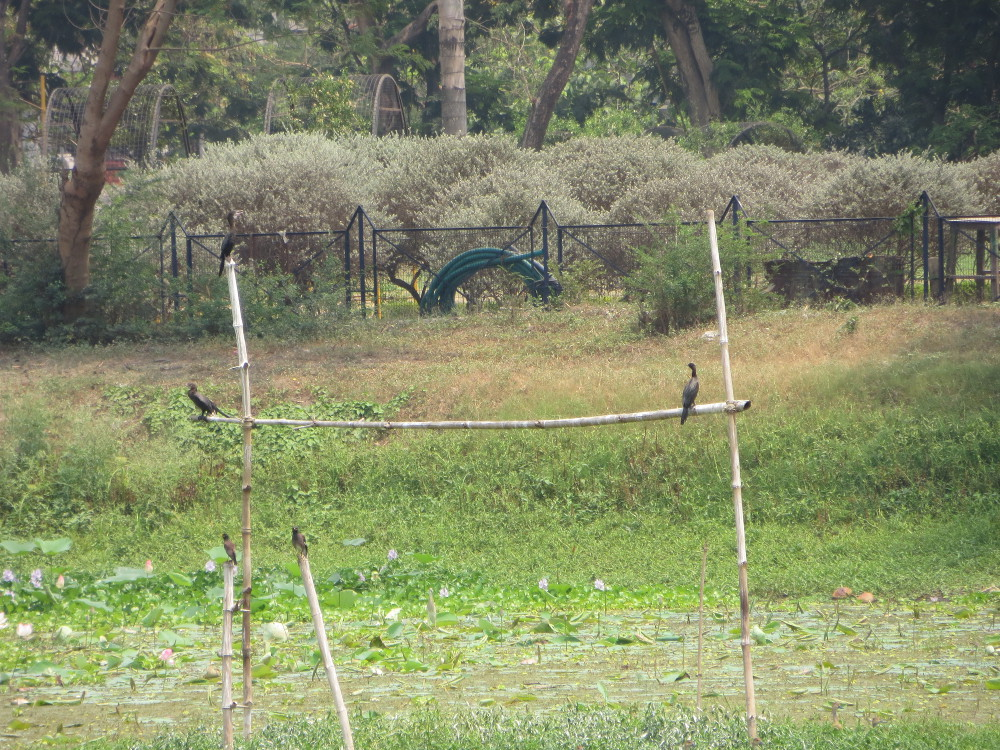
Cormorants

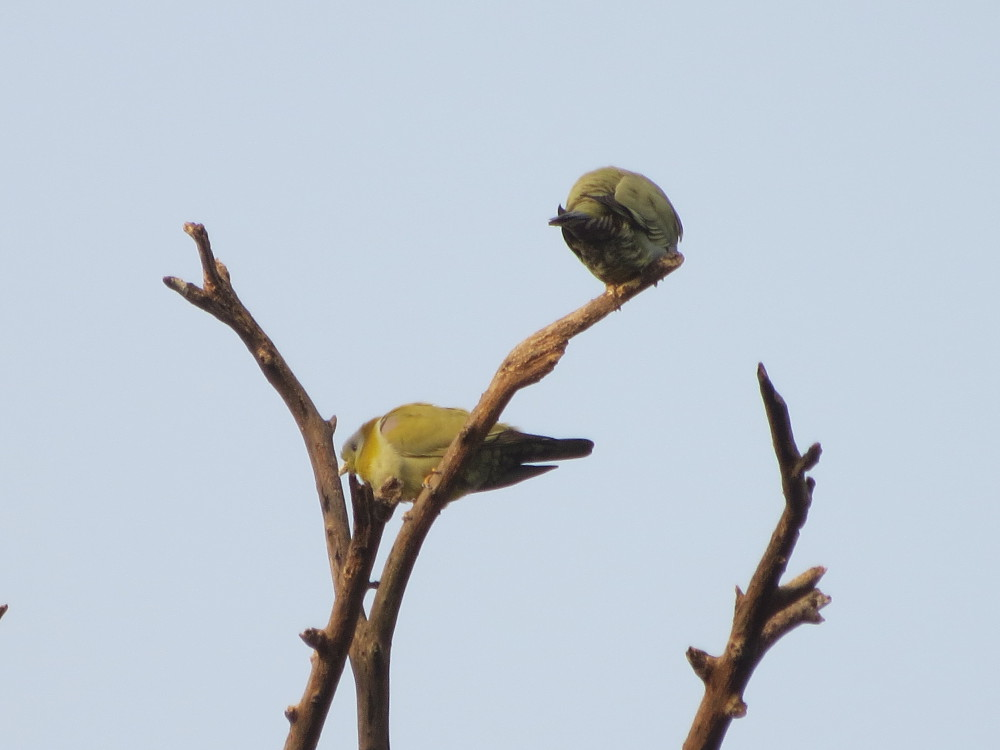
Yellow-footed green pigeons

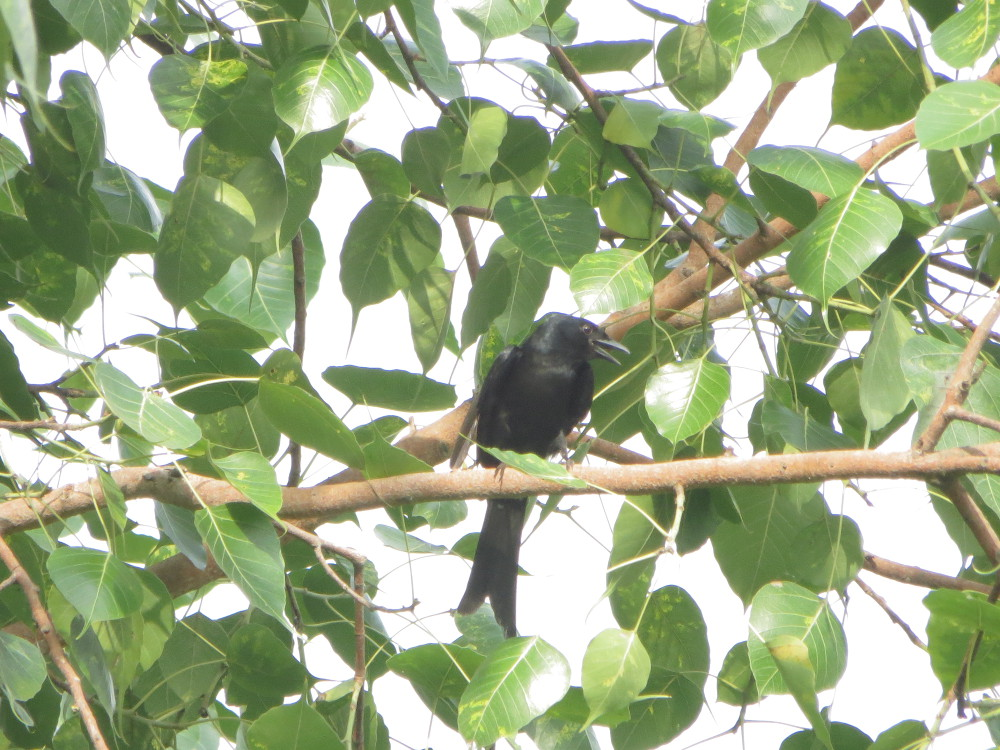
Black drongo

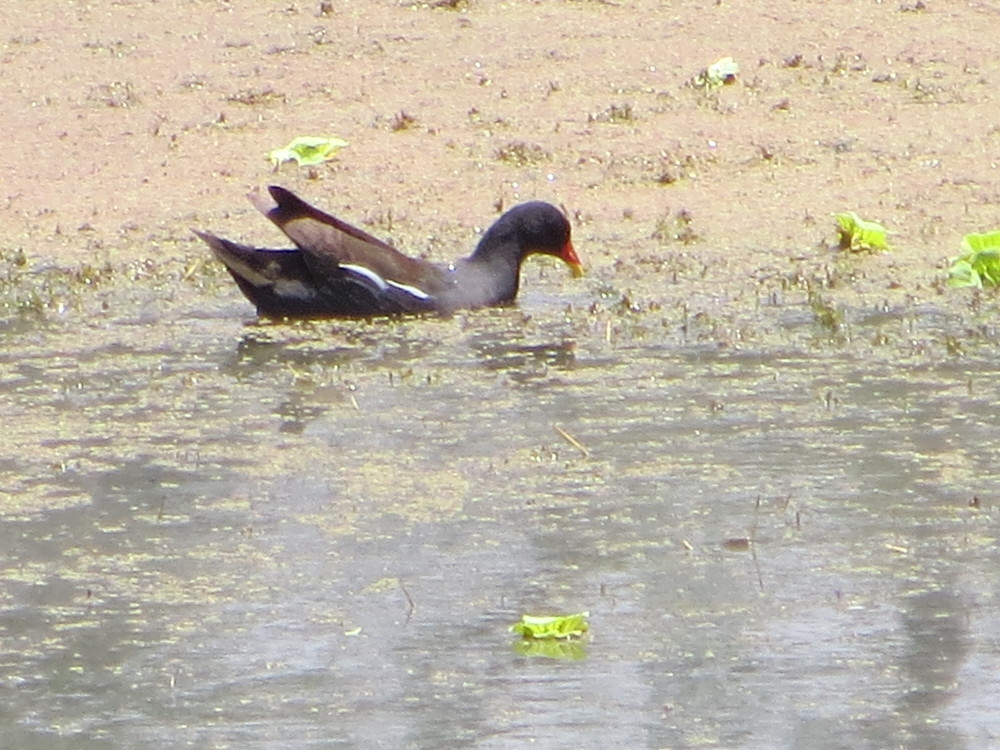
Common moorhen

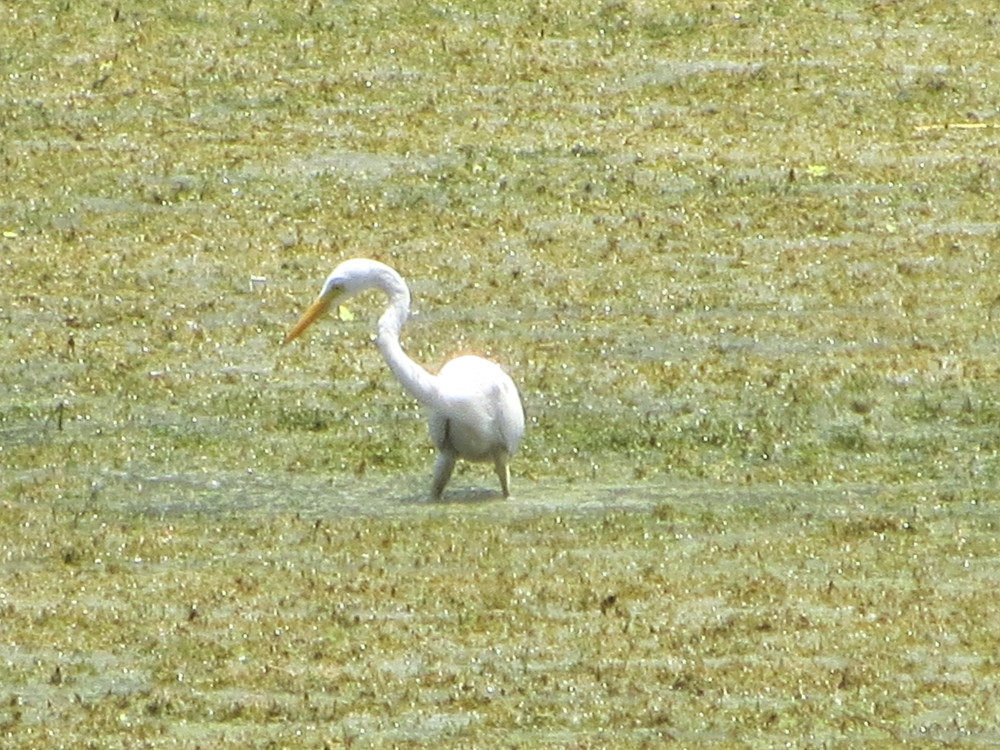
Intermediate egret

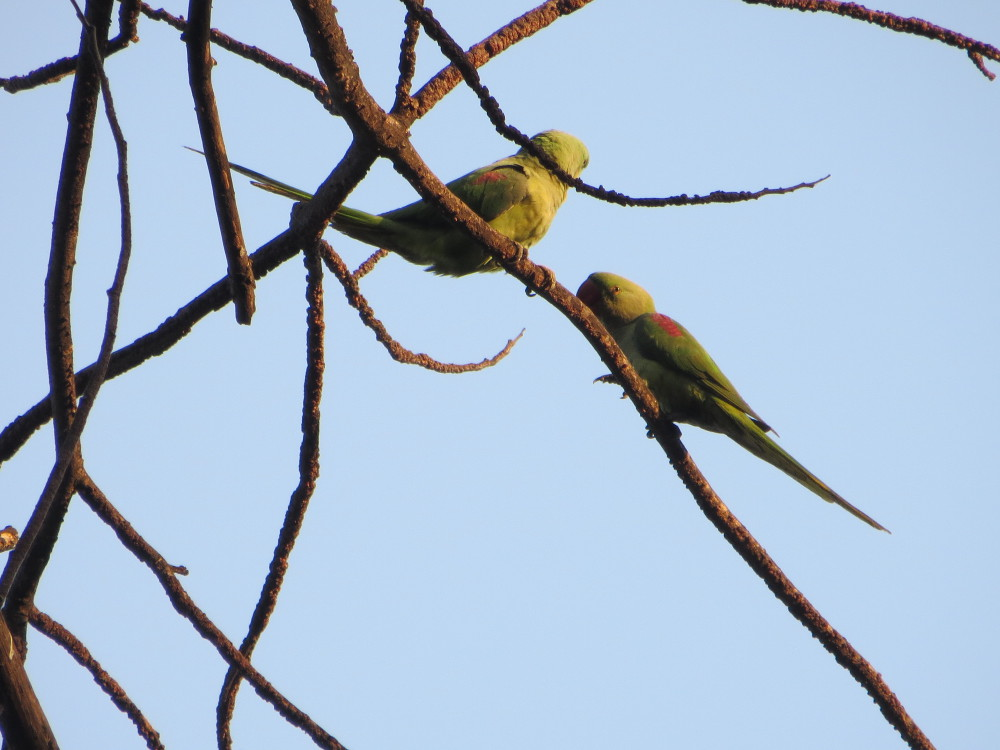
Alexandrine parakeets

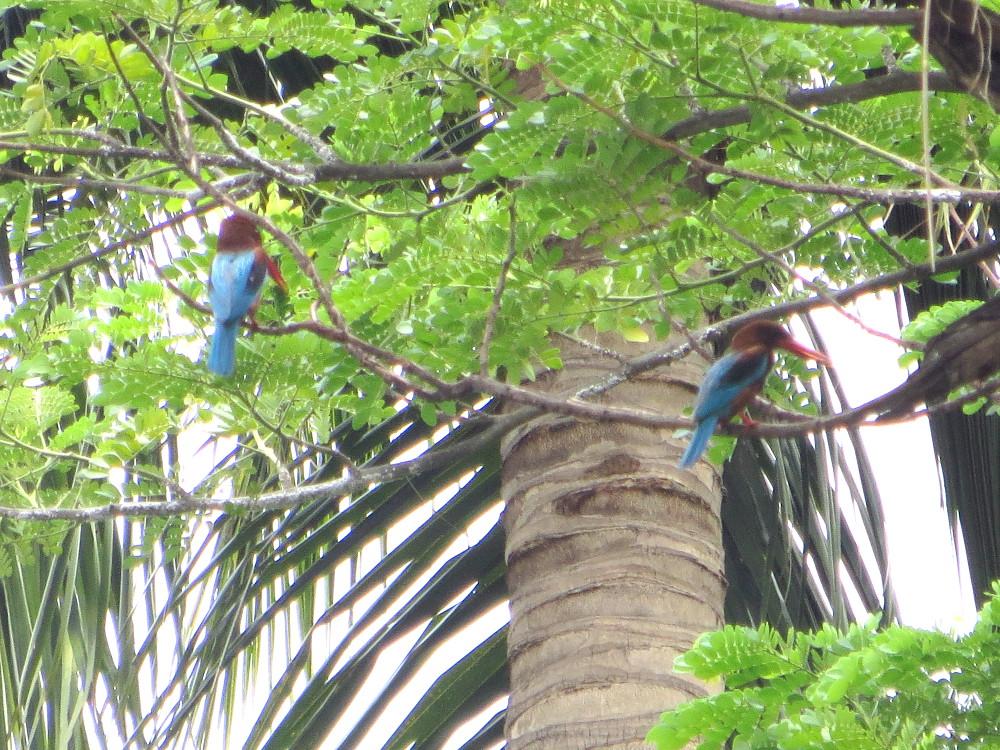
Pair of white-throated kingfishers

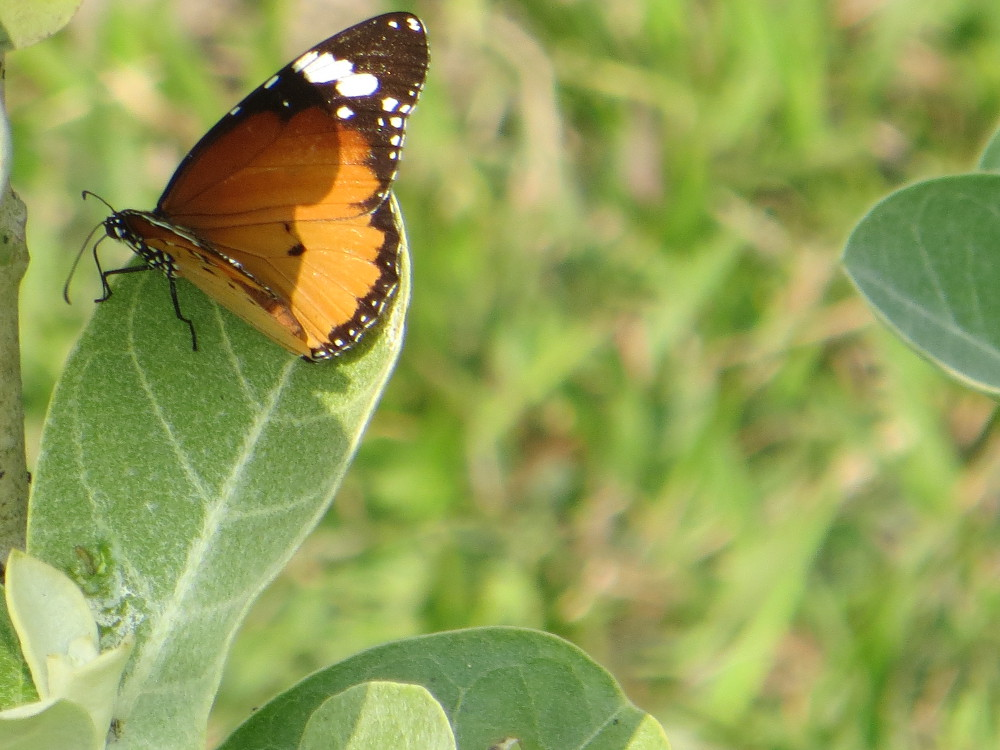
Plain tiger

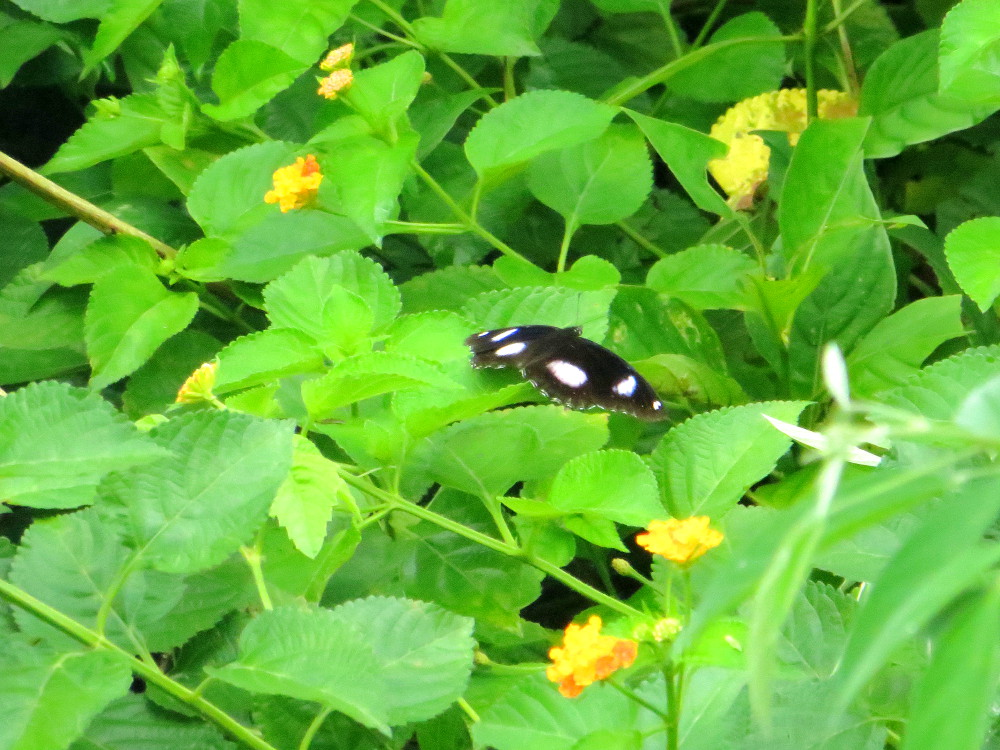
Great eggfly

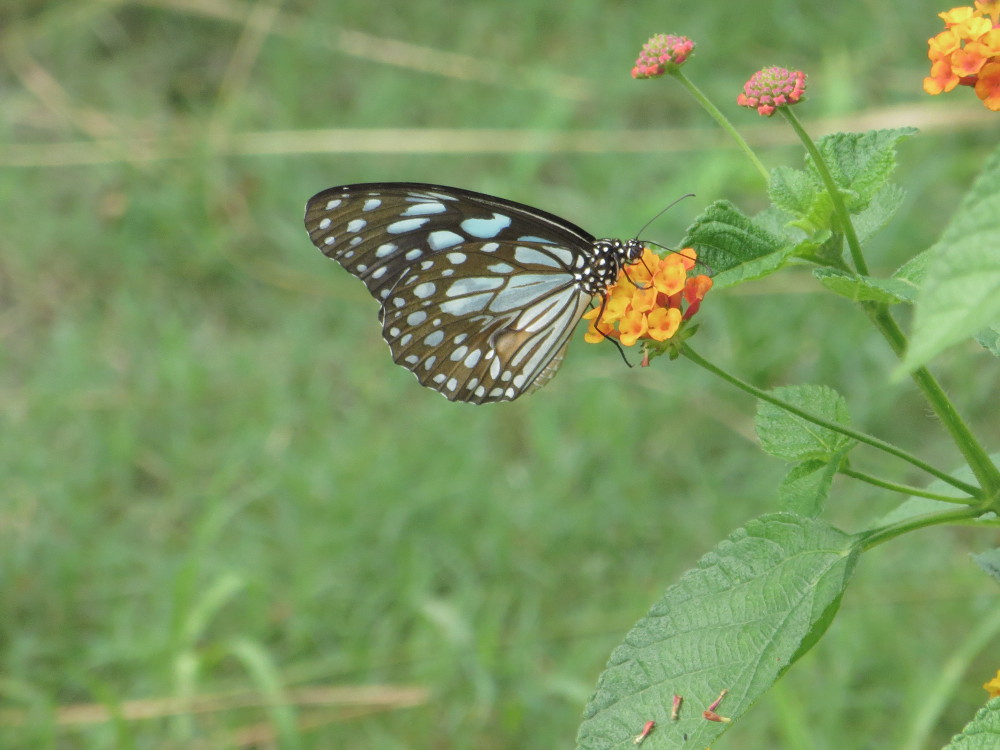
Blue tiger

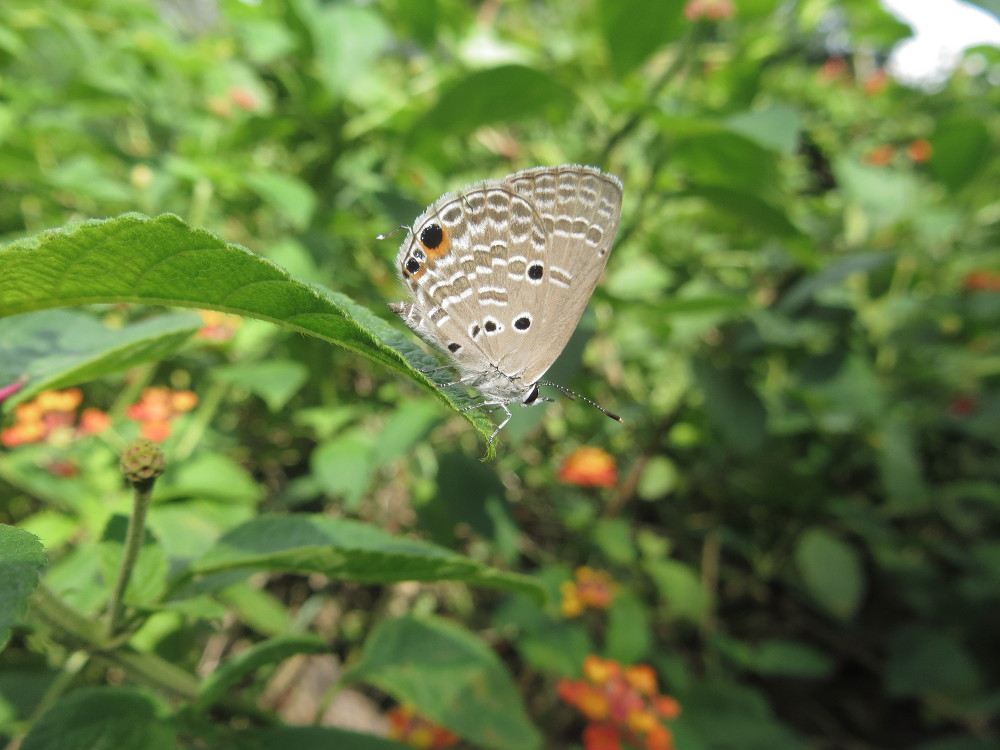
Plains Cupid

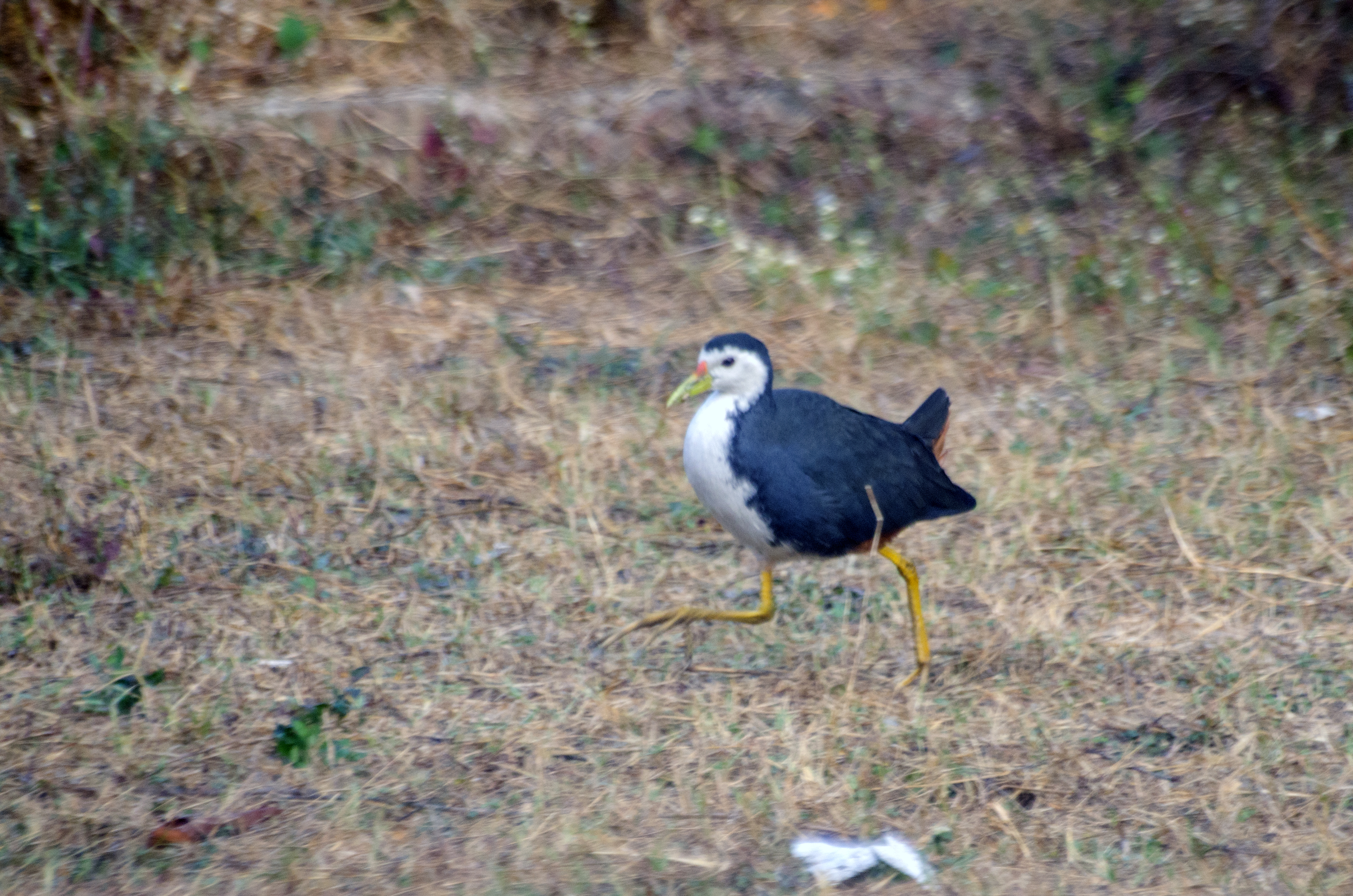
White Breasted Waterhen

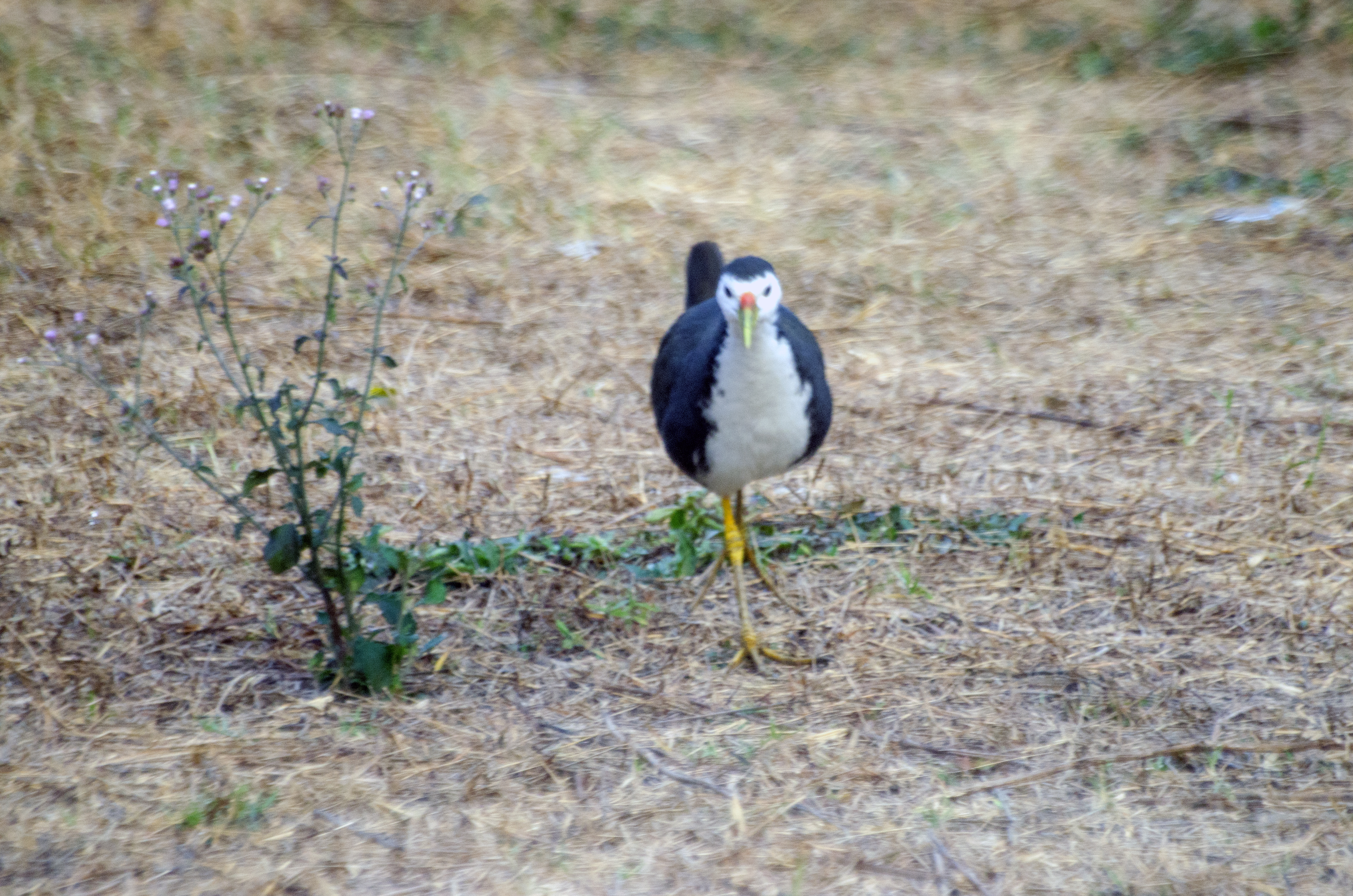
White Breasted Waterhen

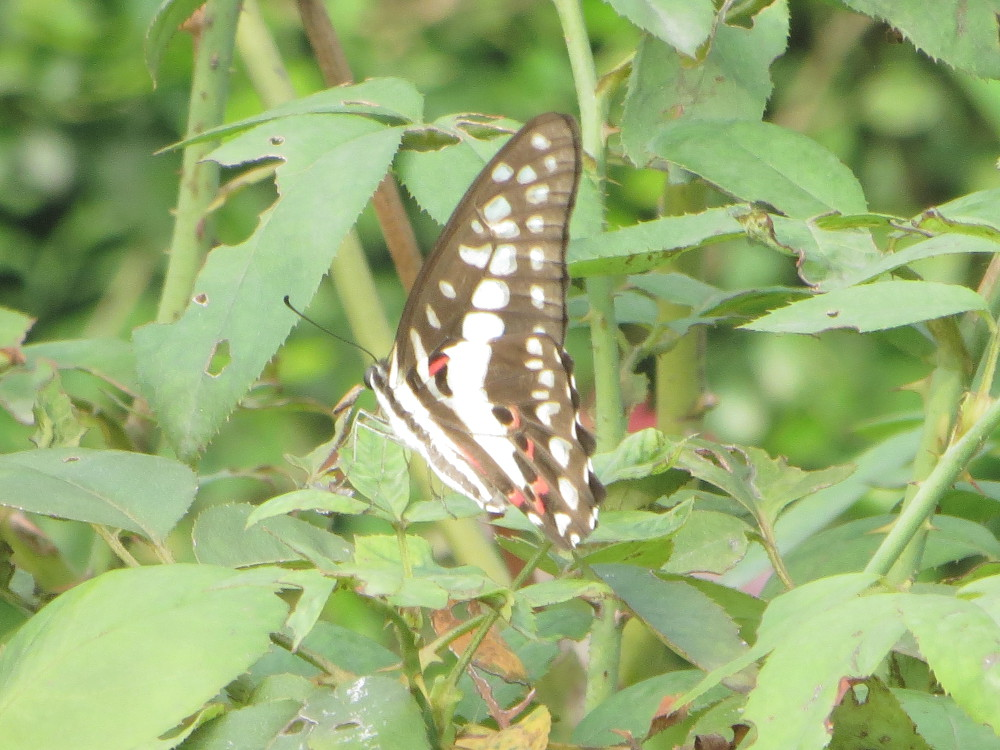
Common jay

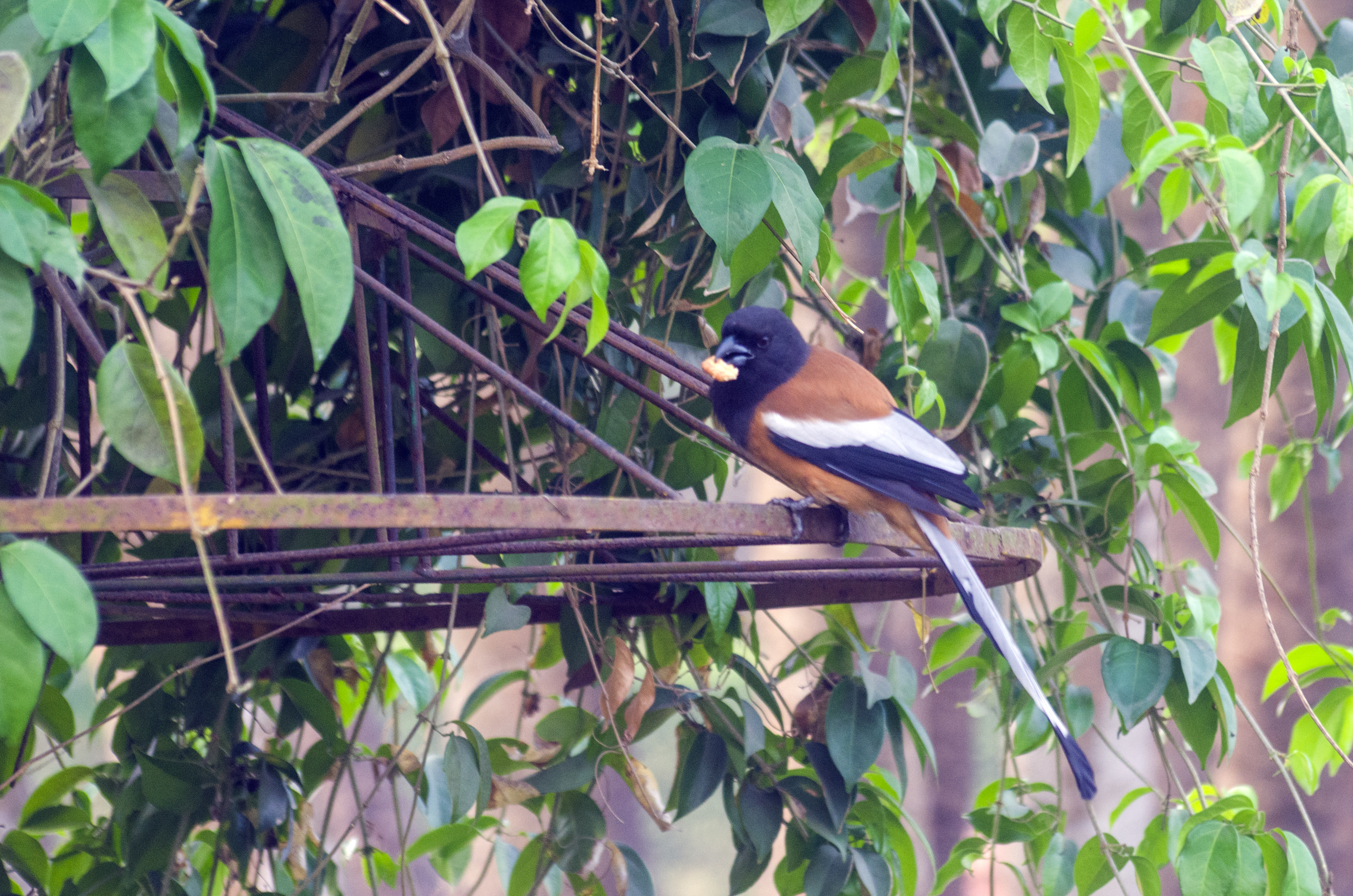
Rufous Treepie

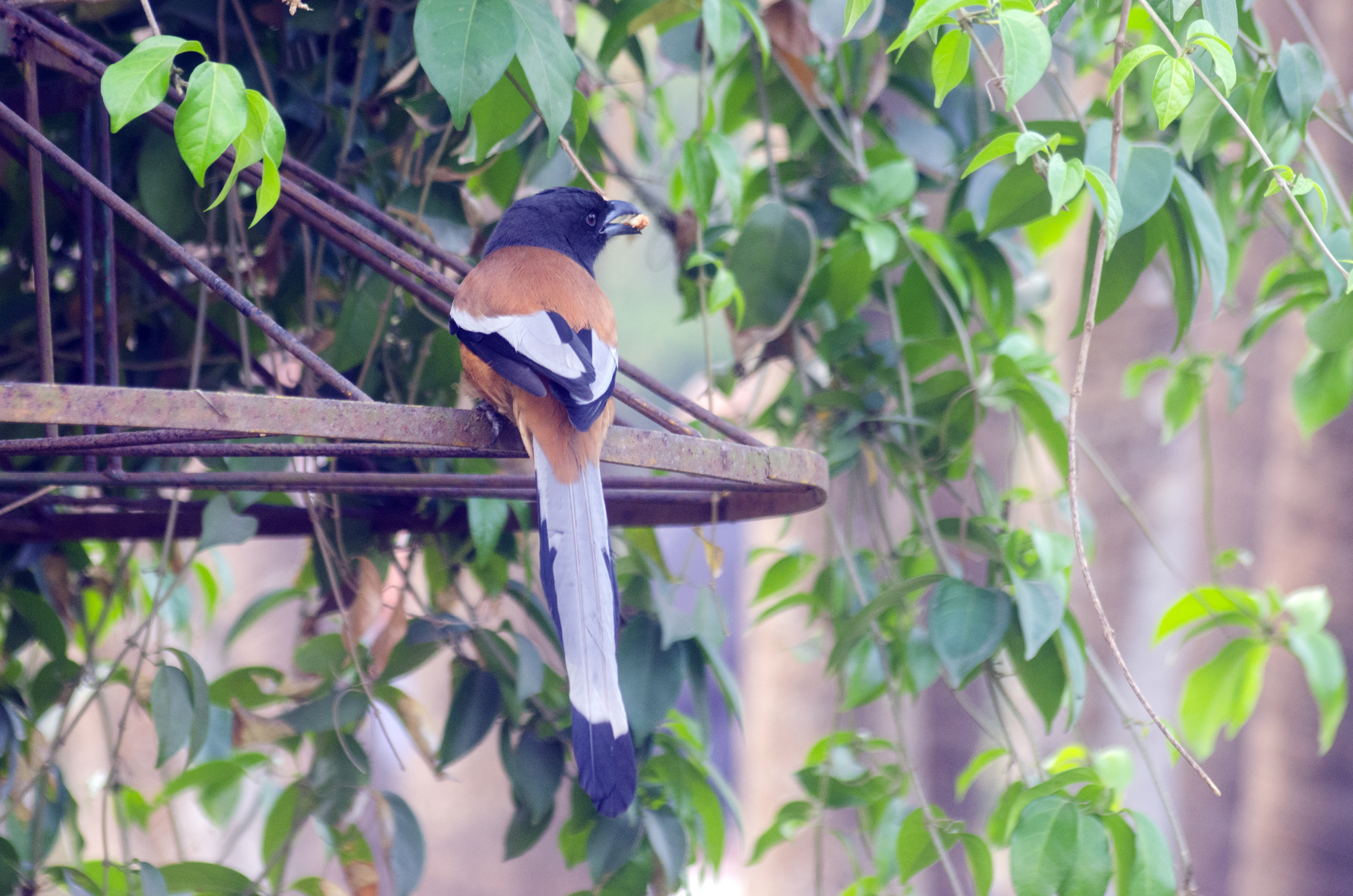
Rufous Treepie
