= East–West Metro Tunnel =

First underwater metro tunnel in India

Overview
- Other name: Hooghly River Tunnel
- Location: Kolkata, India
- Status: Constructed in 2021 by Afcons Infrastructure (underwater section); 6 March 2024 (inaugurated) started operations commercially on and from 15 March 2024
- Start: Phoolbagan metro station, Kolkata
- End: Howrah Maidan metro station, Howrah

Operation
- Owner: Kolkata Metro Rail Corporation
- Operator: Kolkata Metro Rail Corporation
- Traffic: Kolkata Metropolitan Region

Technical
- Length: 10.8 km (6.7 mi); 0.520 km (0.323 mi) (underneath Hooghly)

East–West Metro Tunnel is an underwater river tunnel of Kolkata Metro in Kolkata, West Bengal. The river tunnel is constructed underneath Hooghly River. It is the biggest underwater river tunnel of India, which is made for metro rail service. The East–West Metro Tunnel length is 10.8 km (6.7 mi) and width is 5.5 metres (18 ft 1 in). A 520 m (1,706 ft 0 in) stretch of the tracks goes through a tunnel under the Hooghly River. The roof of the tunnel is about 30 metres (98 ft 5 in) from the ground level. The tunnel was completed in 2021. The tunnel is used by Green Line, also known as East–West Metro Line, for metro rail service by Kolkata Metro Rail Corporation and it was constructed by Afcons Infrastructure.

== Construction ==
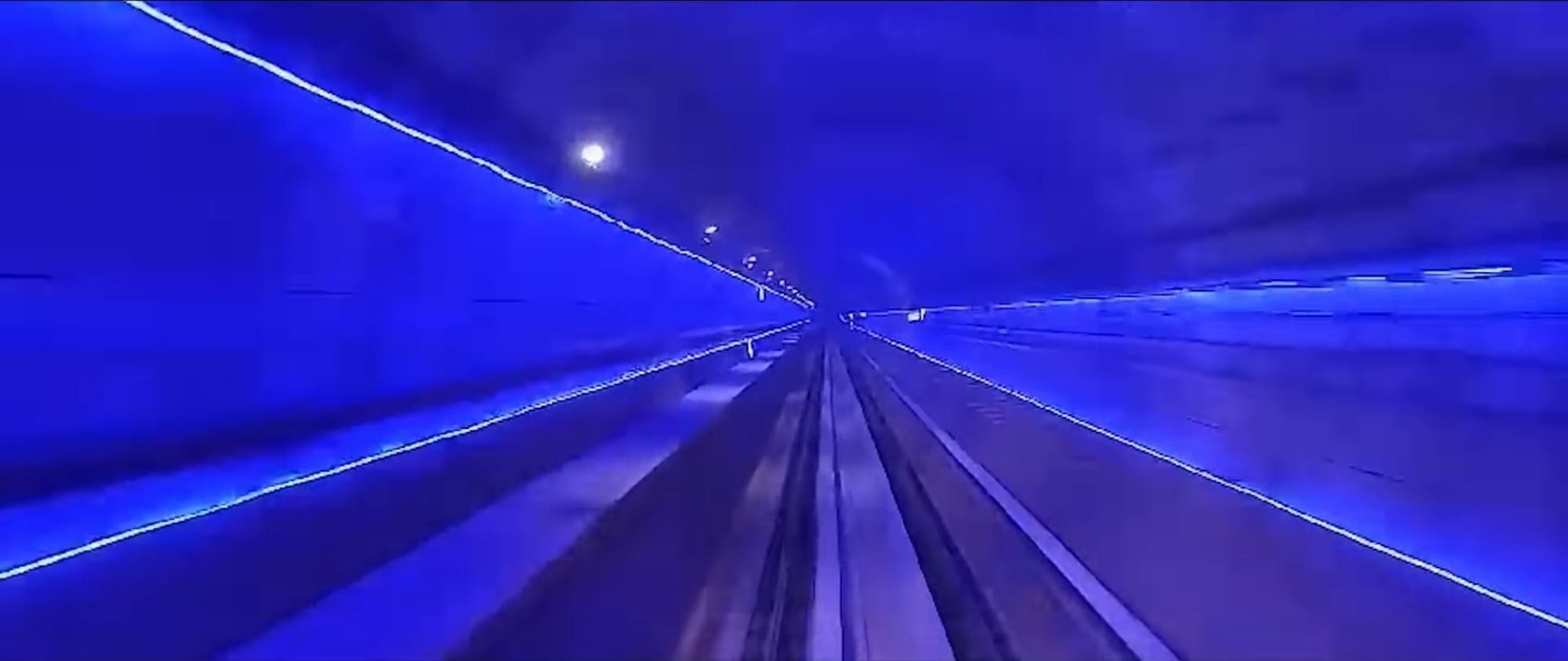
Hooghly River Underwater metro tunnel segment

East–West metro tunnel underwater section journey

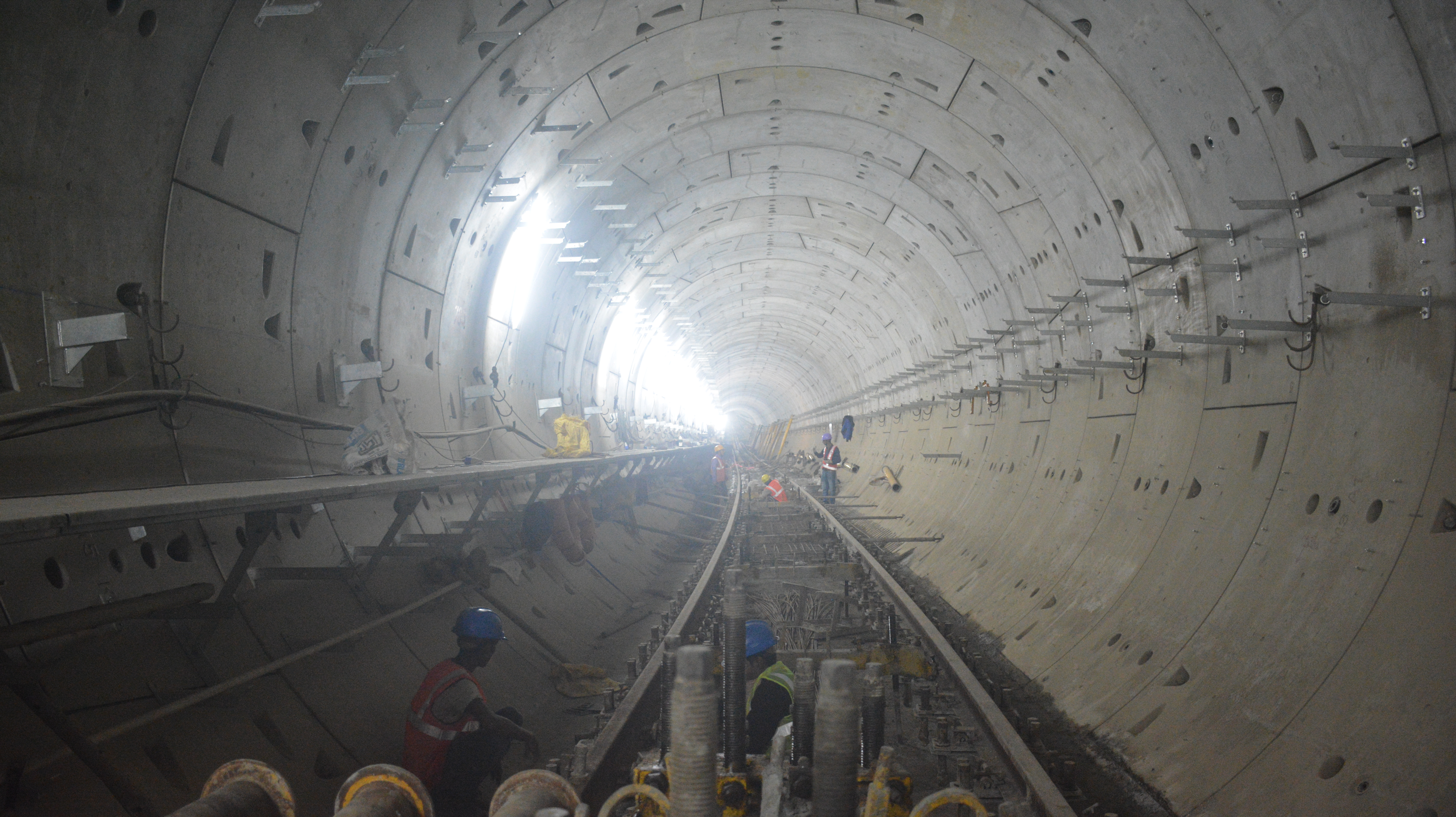
East–West Metro Tunnel, under Hooghly River – biggest underwater metro tunnel in India

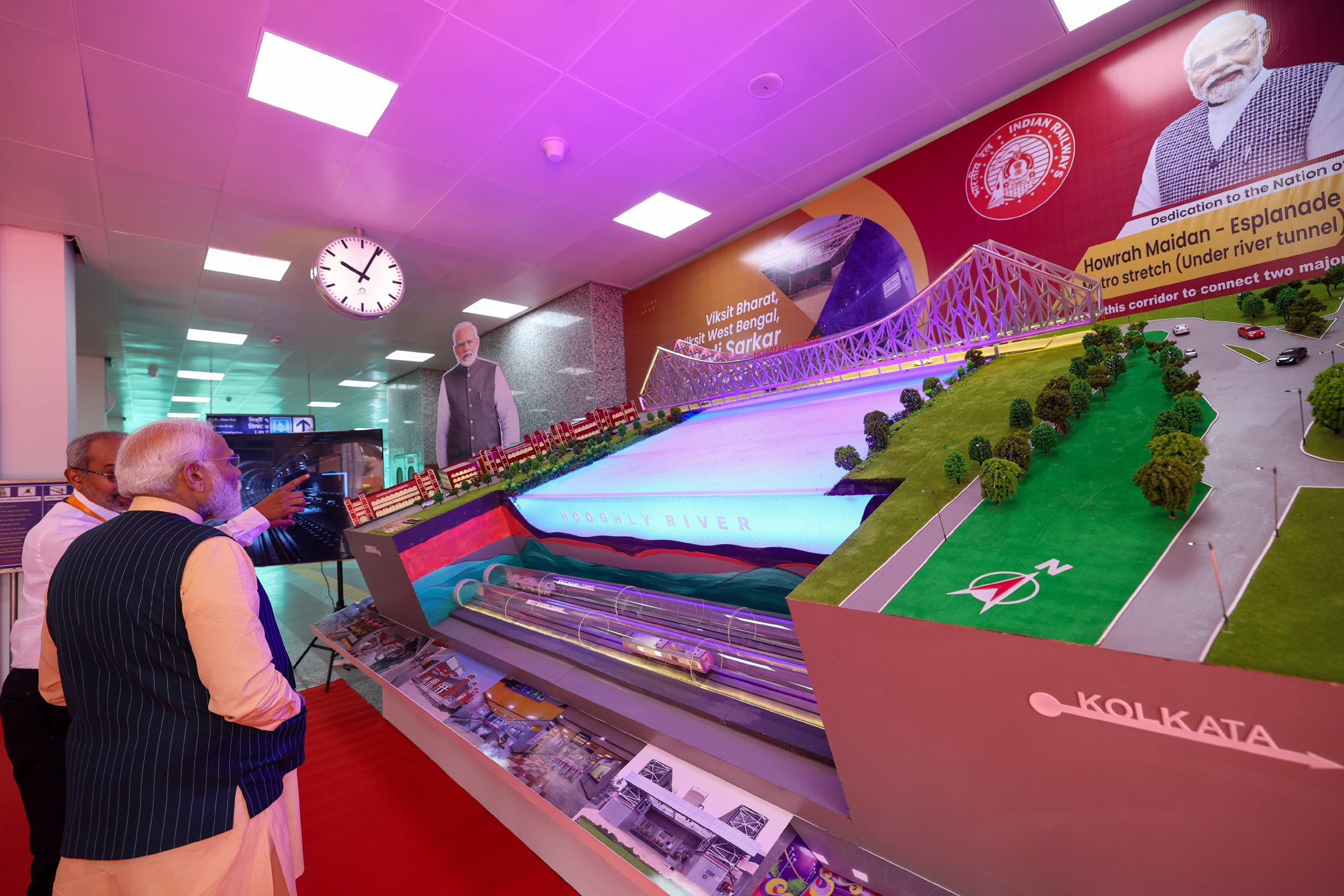
Artists Conception of East–West underwater metro at Esplanade Metro station

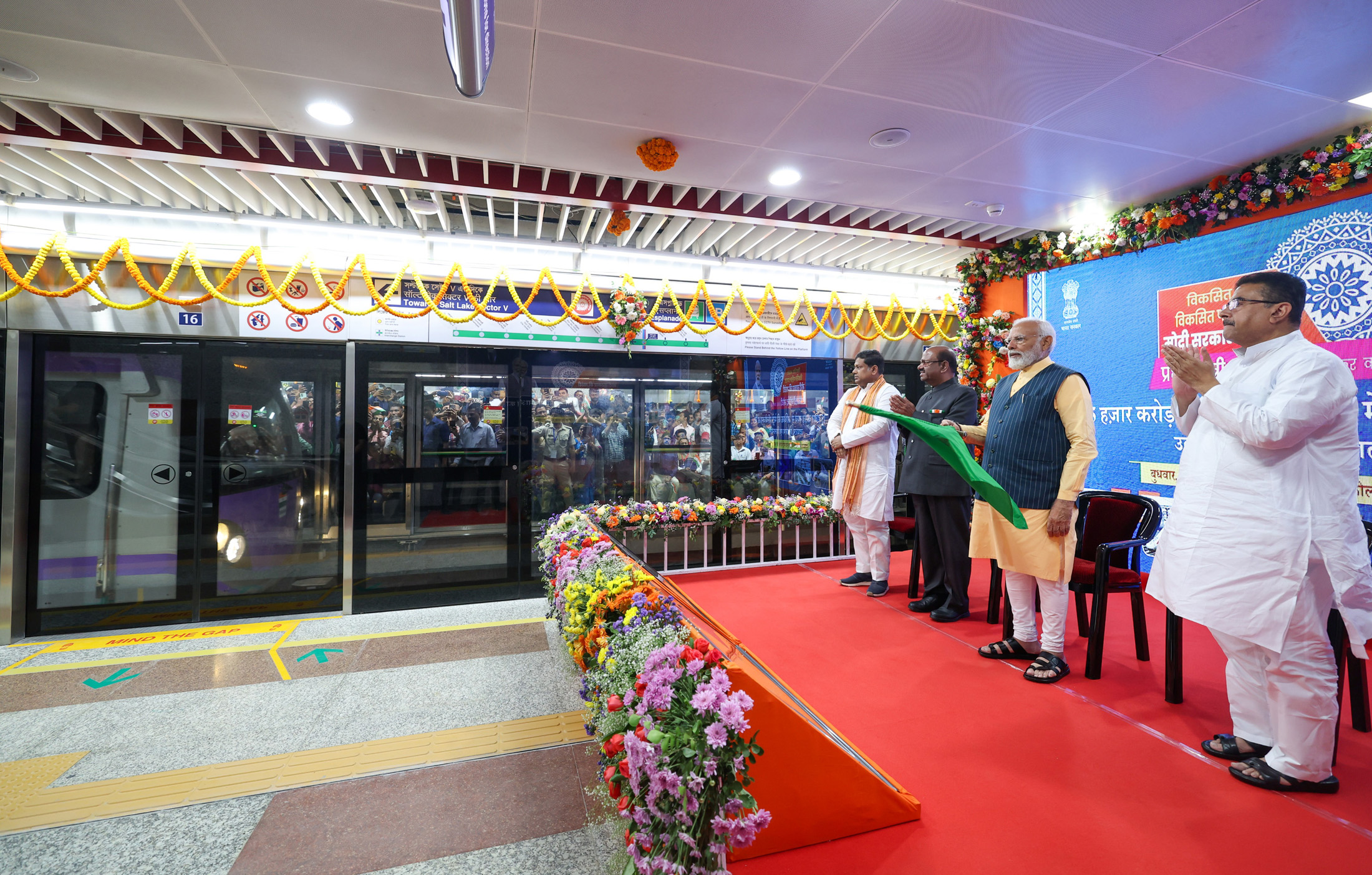
Prime Minister Narendra Modi flags off the metro, with inaugurating the tunnel, with the Howrah Maidan-Esplanade stretch on March 6, 2024.

The section between Sealdah metro station and Mahakaran metro station was realigned due to the inability of GoWB to provide land on the surface along the original route. Even on the new alignment a station planned at Wellington had to be dropped as Government of West Bengal was unable to provide the required land on the surface. Work at Howrah Maidan have started in March 2016. The section between Howrah Maidan metro station and Esplanade metro station has been built by Afcons – Transtonnelstroy JV team, two tunnel boring machines from Herrenknecht are being used to dig the tunnel. This section passes through the Hooghly River for a distance of 520 metres (1,706 ft 0 in). The section under the river is at a depth of 30 metres (98 ft 5 in) (roof to ground distance) whereas the average roof to ground distance is 17 metres (55 ft 9 in). The Howrah metro station on the west side of the river will be at a depth of 30 metres (98 ft 5 in). Tunnelling started from Howrah Maidan side. On 23 May one of the TBM named Rachna completed the tunneling under the Hooghly River in 36 days. The other TBM named Prerna also completed the tunnelling work under the river on 21 June 2017. There were some concerns during tunnelling under Brabourne Road as the tunnel would pass within 100 metres (328 ft 1 in) of heritage structures and there were also many old and dilapidated buildings in this section. KMRC received permission from Archaeological Survey of India in June 2017. Residents and shops in the old building were temporarily shifted and the buildings were reinforced before construction of tunnel. Construction of tunnel until Mahakaran station was completed in November 2017. For the Mahakaran–Esplanade section tunnelling of one of the tunnel has been completed on 23 March 2018 the other tunnel has also been completed by April. In this sections also shops and residents of the buildings have been shifted in phased manner before tunnelling. The Esplanade–Sealdah section will be executed by ITD-ITD Cementation JV and was scheduled to start in May 2018.

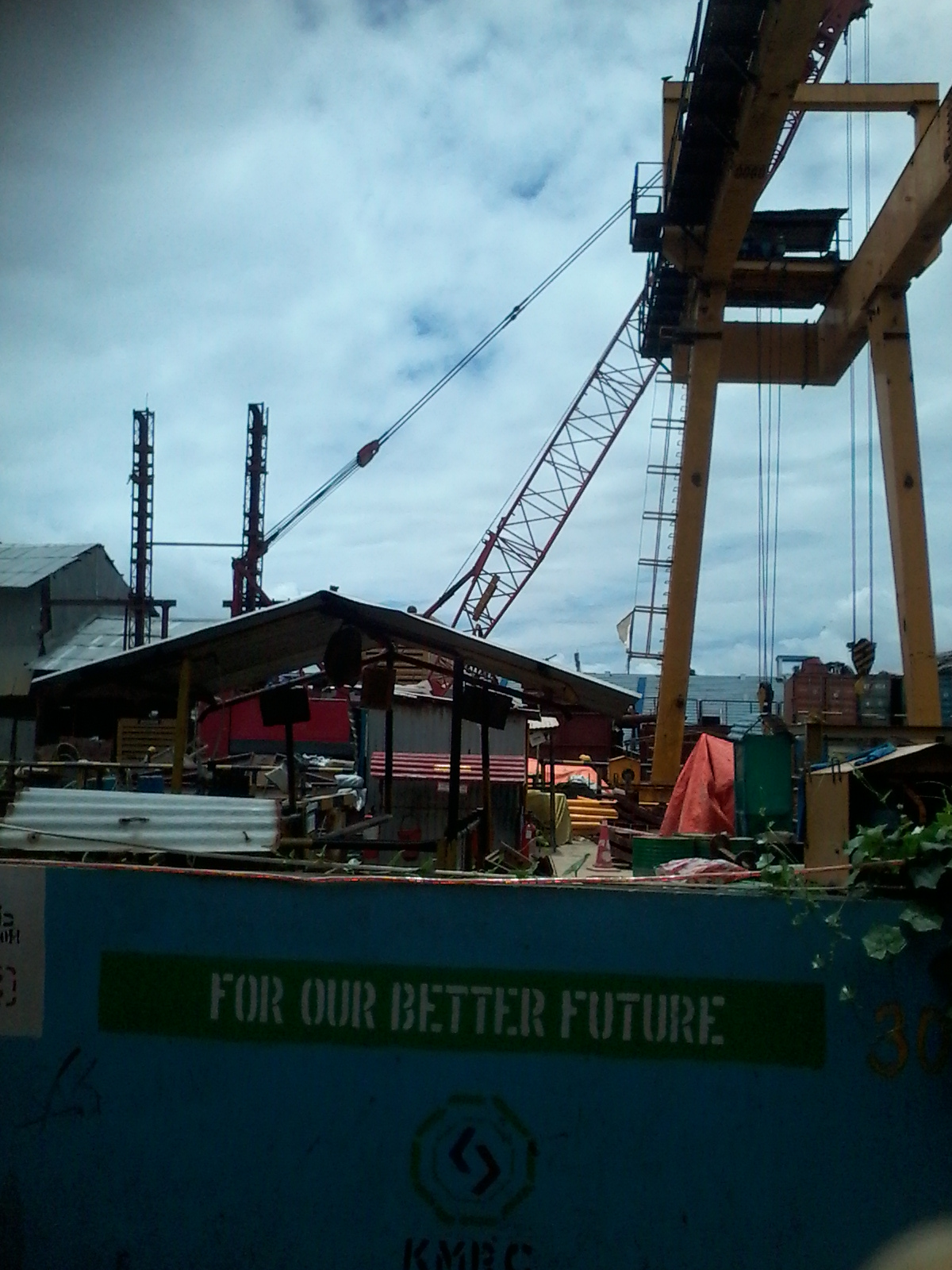
Work being done at Howrah Maidan metro station

5490 meters of tunnel have been constructed between Subhas Sarobar and Sealdah. This section was constructed by ITD-ITD Cementation JV. All the cross passes between the two tunnels have also been completed. Track laying is being carried out in this section. The tunneling work was stopped due to collapse of building on 3 September 2019 over the Bowbazar area due to TBM hitting an aquifer. The work resumed in June, 2020 and successfully completed the affected area.

As the work began, the national and regional media claimed this project as a big milestone terming India's first under water and “underwater river” metro tunnel, but it's not true. While the Hooghly River is very wide and requires tons of engineering challenges in constructing tunnels, there are other metro lines built in India cities which get the discussed titles, including Kolkata metro's operational Line-1 as the first one:

• Kolkata Metro Blue Line: Under the Circular Canal falling between the Shyambazar and Belgachia metro stations. (built in 1990s) Today, East–West Metro also passes under this canal between Phoolbagan and Sealdah metro stations.

• Delhi Metro Line 2 (Yellow): Under the Najafgarh Drain in northern Delhi (built in 2007) and Kushak Drain in southern Delhi (built in 2009).

• Chennai Metro Line 1 (Blue): Under the Cooum River in central Chennai while passing from the Government Estate to Chennai Central metro station (built in 2015–17).

Working cautiously, coupled with some more subsidences, all tunnelling works, retrieval of the two TBMs and closure of all shafts were completed in April 2023. The Metro authorities deemed the Esplanade-Sealdah section (particularly the incomplete, caved-in west-bound tunnel), to be challenging and impossible to finish by 2023. So, they planned to run trains (brought via completed east-bound tunnel) over a truncated Esplanade-Howrah Maidan section that is almost complete. For this, the authorities brought two racks from Central Park depot to Esplanade metro station on 9 April 2023. They were brought via a battery-powered, hybrid locomotive as Esplanade-Sealdah section is not electrified. From there, the wheels of railways rolled for the first time below the Hoogly river when, both trains arrived at Howrah Maidan station on 13 April 2023. Currently, trial runs are ongoing over this truncated section, after which the authorities expect this section to be opened for commercial operations at the end of this year. Later, Kolkata Metro added blue light in the underwater tunnel section to give passengers a sense of feeling under Hooghly River.

The Esplanade–Howrah Maidan section of the Green Line was inaugurated on 6 March 2024, along with the truncated sections of Taratala–Majerhat under Purple Line and Kavi Subhash–Hemanta Mukhopadhyay under Orange Line. This left the Esplanade–Sealdah section as the remaining part of Green Line tunnel, that was opened on 22 August 2025.

Just before the tunnel enters the underwater segment, lies a ventilation shaft on the Kolkata bank of Hooghly River, which is the deepest of its kind in India, at 44 metres (144 ft) below ground level.

== Timelines ==
- 2009: Contract for building the underground section from Subhash Sarabor to Central Station awarded to ITD-ITD Cementation JV.
- 2009: Physical construction of E–W corridor starts.
- 2010: Contract for building the underwater tunnel section from Central to Howrah Maidan awarded to Afcons.
- 2012: Realignment proposed to avoid shifting of 80 families from Bowbazar and hawkers from Brabourne Road.
- 2015: Realignment approved by Railways and JICA in between Sealdah to Howrah station.
- 2015: Subodh Mullick Square station, a key stop in the revised blueprint, done away with to avoid eviction of hawkers.
- 2017-March: Afcons nicknames the tunnel boring machines as Prerna and Rachna inspired from the names of daughter of their employee.
- 2017 – May 23: First TBM completes tunneling the eastbound tunnel under the Hooghly river.
- 2017 – June 21: Second TBM completes tunneling the westbound tunnel under the river Hooghly.
- 2017-June: Permission received from Archaeological Survey of India for construction of tunnel within 100 meters of three heritage buildings.
- 2017-July: Tram depot at Esplanade shifted to facilitate construction of Metro Station.
- 2017-July: People from 11 buildings in Brebourne Road evacuated in phased manner when the TBM's passes below these old buildings.
- 2017-August: Mini-bus stand at Mahakaran shifted to facilitate the construction of underground station.
- 2017-December: Tunnelling between Mahakaran station and Esplanade station on going.
- 2018 – March 23: First TBM named Prerna reaches Esplanade station completing the section from Howrah Maidan to Esplanade. This tunnel will be used by Howrah bound tunnel.
- 2018 – Apr 5: Second TBM named Rachna completes boring of second tunnel between Howrah Maidan and Esplanade station.
- 2019 – Apr 14: Tunneling stopped due to lack of muck cars, and needed to be upgraded. Work started again after 5 days.
- 2019 – Jun 23: TBMs Rachna & Prerna, after being parked at Curzon Park for few months, are finally being taken out.
- 2019 – July 3: Both the TBMs are successfully taken out and loaded on trailers. With this, Rachna and Prerna's journey of tunneling under a river comes to an end.
- 2023 - May: Tunneling of East–West Metro tunneling is complete.
- 2024 - March 6: East–West metro gets inaugurated by Indian prime minister Narendra Modi, but not yet opened to general public
- 2024 - March 15: East–West metro (Howrah Maidan to Esplanade) will start operations commercially, and will be opened for general public. Commercial operations are presently available in this route.
- 2024-December 17: After TBM Urvi completed its tunnelling, a 38 m (125 ft) critical gap of westbound tunnel was still completed. This part was completed carefully by traditional cut and cover method.
- 2025-January: Trial run successfully conducted in westbound tunnel between Sealdah and Esplanade.
- 2025-August: The Sealdah-Esplanade section was opened.
