= Sealdah station =

Sealdah station may refer to:

- Sealdah railway station, a main railway terminal in Kolkata, India
- Sealdah metro station, an underground rapid transit station in Kolkata, India
