= Kolkata Metro Rail Corporation =

Public transport company

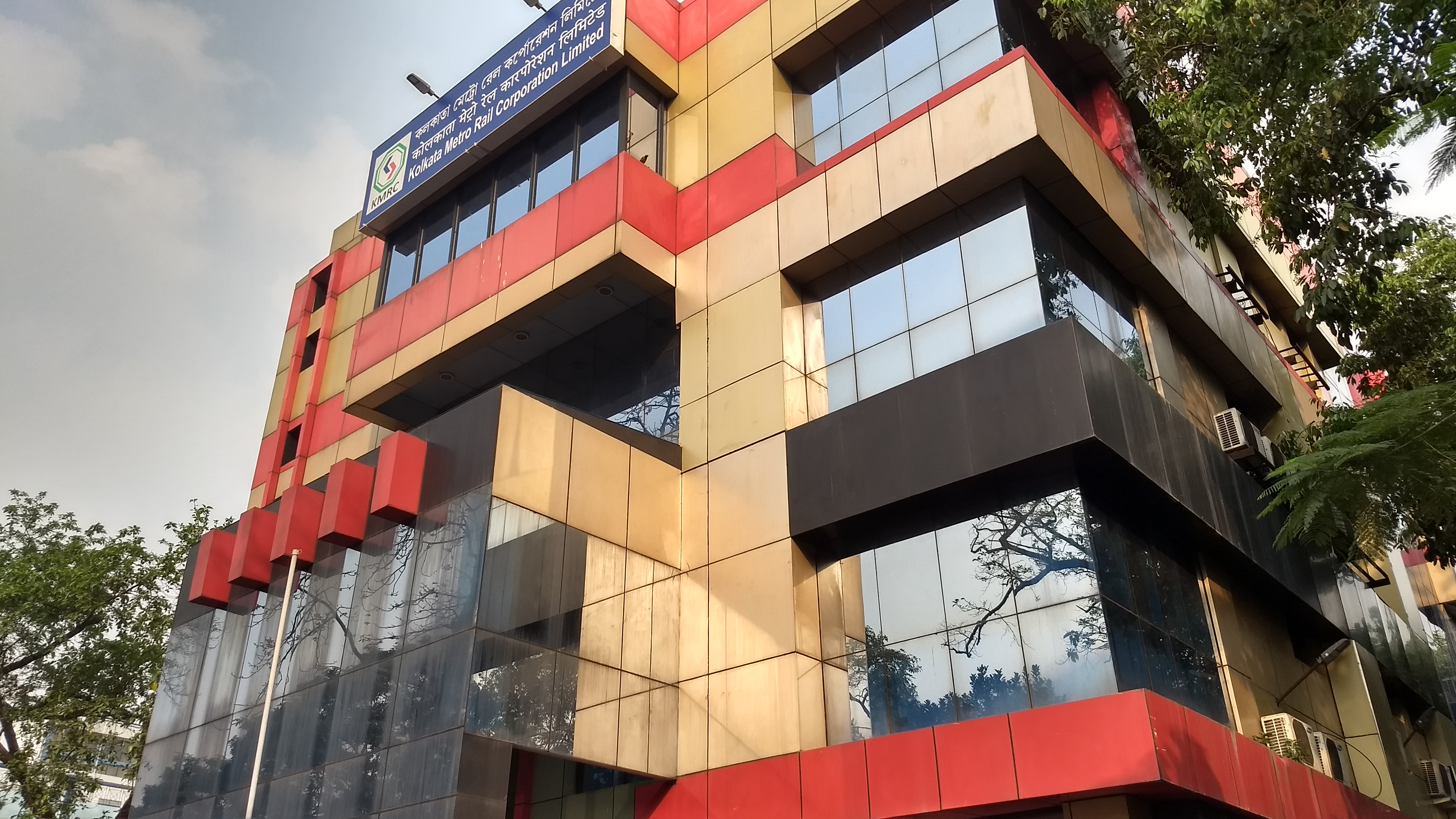
- Headquarters in Kolkata
- Company type: Government-owned corporation
- Founded: July 2008; 17 years ago
- Headquarters: KMRCL Bhawan, HRBC Complex, 2nd & 3rd Floor, Munsi Premchand Sarani, Kolkata, West Bengal, India
- Area served: Kolkata, Howrah
- Key people: Anuj Mittal (Managing Director); Smt. Chandrima Roy (Chief Vigilance Officer)
- Services: Public transport
- Revenue: ₹12.843 lakh (equivalent to ₹14 lakh or US$16,000 in 2023) (2022)
- Net income: ▲₹7.9286 lakh (equivalent to ₹8.4 lakh or US$9,900 in 2023) (2022)
- Total assets: ▲₹8,461.774 crore (equivalent to ₹90 billion or US$1.1 billion in 2023) (2022)
- Owner: Government of India Ministry of Railways:- 74% Ministry of Housing and Urban Affairs:- 26%
- Website: kmrc.in
- Footnotes / references "ANNUAL REPORT ENGLISH 2021-2022" (PDF). Kolkata Metro Rail Corporation Ltd. 2022.

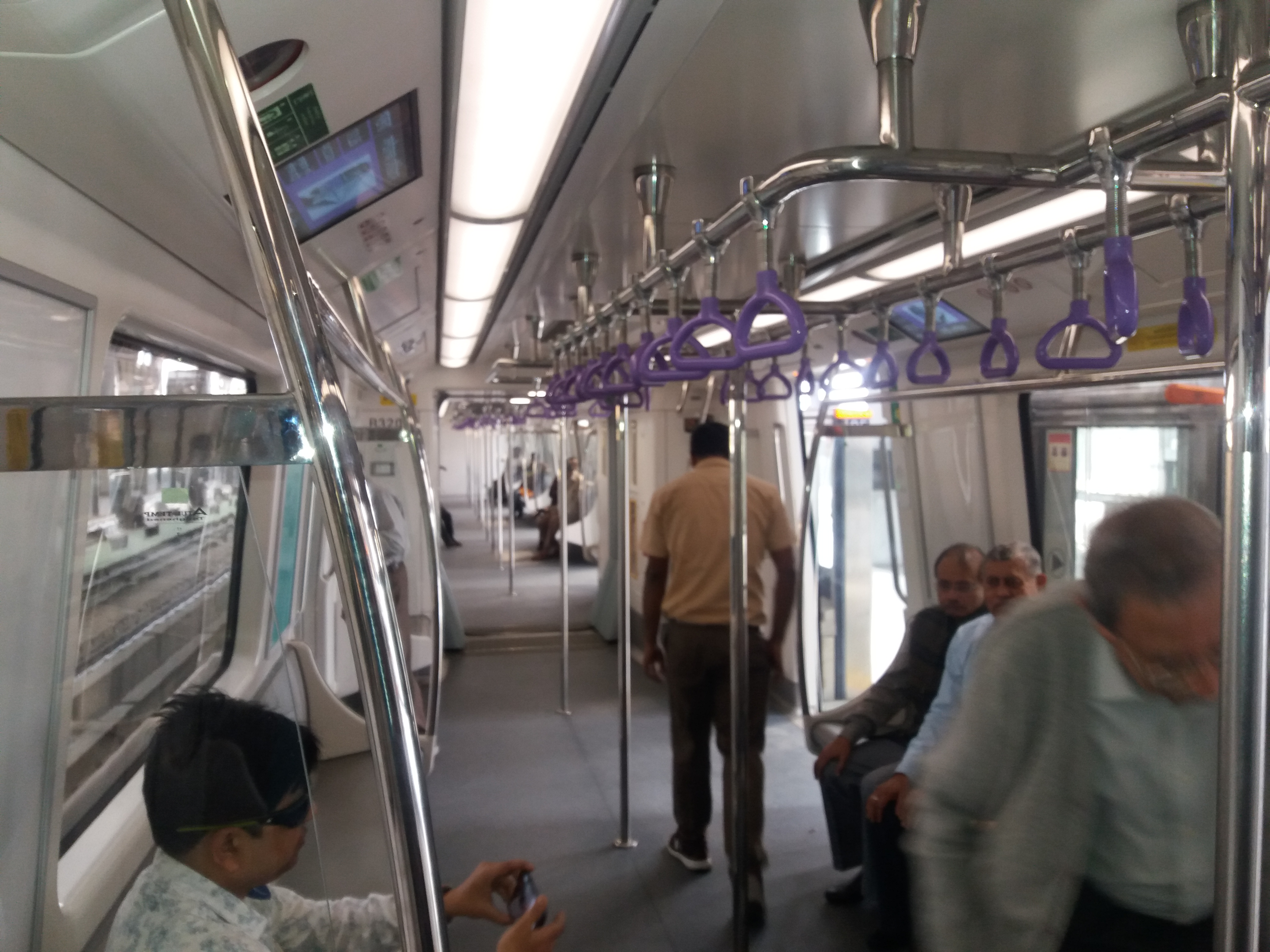
Day one of the East West Metro Kolkata on 13 February 2020.

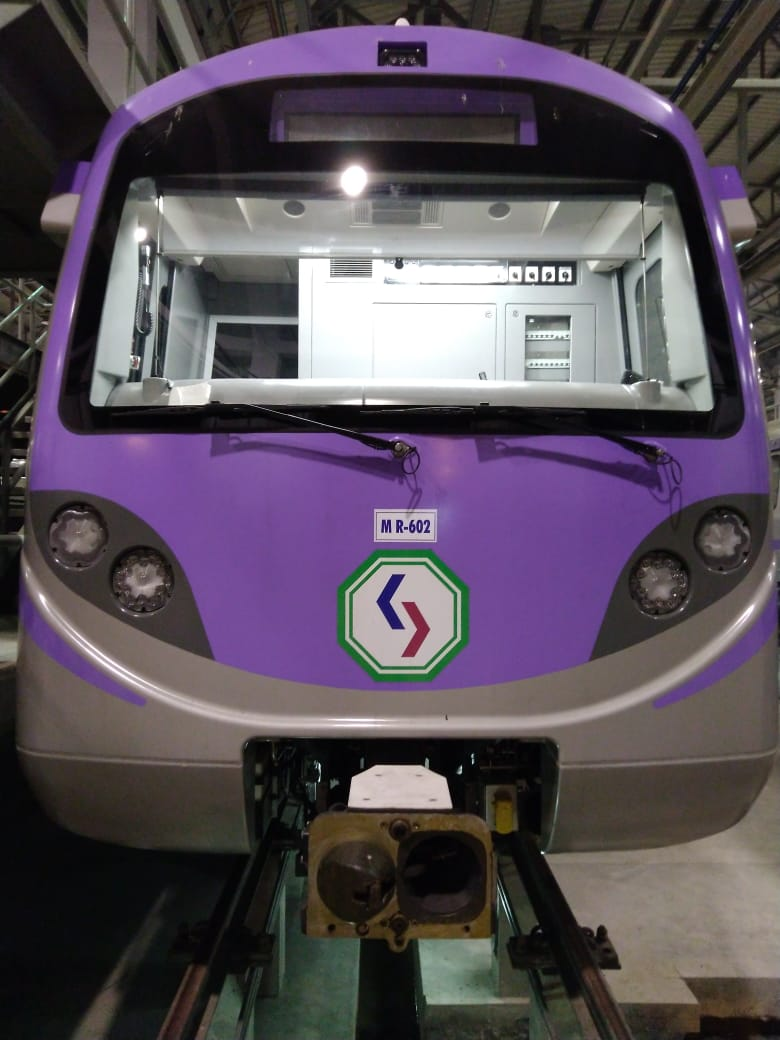
A Kolkata East-West Metro rake

Kolkata Metro Rail Corporation (KMRC) is a Government of India enterprise formed in 2008. The agency was formed to oversee the implementation of the Kolkata Metro Green Line, also known as the East–West Metro, connecting the twin cities Kolkata and Howrah. The metro rail route is partly underground, including the part that will be under the river Ganges. The 16.6 km route has six stations each in underground and elevated portions. The terminal stations are Salt Lake Sector V and the Howrah Maidan. The elevated stretch started operations on 13 February 2020.

== Ownership ==
=== History ===
KMRC was formed as a joint venture company between two govt bodies, i.e. Government of West Bengal and Government of India on a 50-50 partnership basis. Ministry of Urban Development (now renamed as Ministry of Housing and Urban Affairs) holds the shares on behalf of Govt. of India.

On 29 September 2010, it was decided that Govt. of West Bengal withdraws all its shares from KMRC, and Govt. of India will be the shareholder of KMRC along with JICA. Thus Govt. of West Bengal gave all its shares to the Ministry of Railways, and making Kolkata Metro a central government entity again.

=== Current status ===
The current shareholders are given below-

- Ministry of Railways 74% (including the shares of Govt. of West Bengal)
- Ministry of Housing and Urban Affairs 26%

As of 31 March 2017, equity holding details-

- Ministry of Railways– ₹721.50 crore (US$85 million) (68.03%)
- Ministry of Housing and Urban Affairs– ₹339 crore (US$40 million) (31.97%)

== Hurdles faced ==
The main problem that were faced by KMRC was regarding land. Most of the places, non-availability of land led to delay in the project multiple times. Some of them are mentioned below:

- Land issue for construction of a new Central station for Green Line, thus leading to route realignment.
- Land issue in Duttabad for erection of piers of elevated stretch, and leading to resurveying of the stretch by RITES
- Land and rehabilitation issues in construction of Mahakaran station and so shifting the station location.

Other issues were-

- Delay in finalisation of the newly aligned route from Sealdah to Howrah.
- Improper and irregular flow of funds
- Traffic diversion related problems also led to delays
