= Howrah Maidan =

Howrah Maidan can refer to:

- a district of the city of Howrah, West Bengal, India
- Howrah Maidan metro station, a station of the Kolkata Metro in the above district
