= Mahakaran metro station =

Metro station in Kolkata, India

Mahakaran
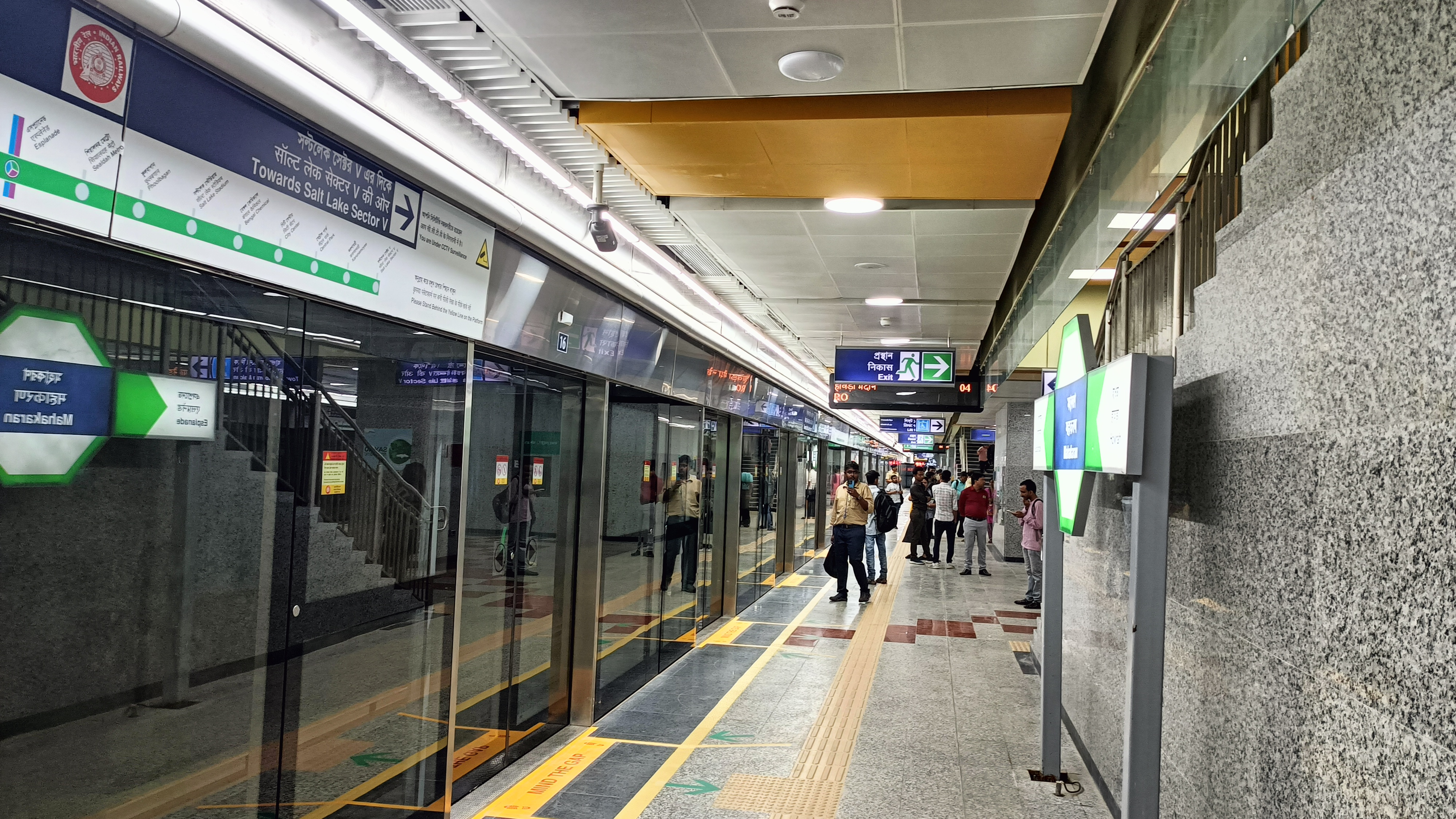
- Salt Lake Sector-V bound Platform

General information
- Location: Old Court House St, B. B. D. Bagh; Kolkata, West Bengal 700001; India
- Coordinates: 22.57207°N 88.35052°E
- System: Kolkata Metro
- Owner: Indian Railways
- Operator: Metro Railway, Kolkata
- Line: Green Line
- Platforms: 2 (1 island platform)

Construction
- Structure type: Underground
- Accessible: Yes
- Architect: Lee Harris Pomeroy Architects with SGI

Other information
- Status: Operational
- Station code: MKNA

History
- Opening: 6 March 2024; 2 years ago

Services
Preceding station	Kolkata Metro	Following station
Howrah towards Howrah Maidan	Green Line	Esplanade towards Salt Lake Sector-V
Route map
Location

Mahakaran (also known as New Mahakaran) (both names are officially correct), is a metro station on Green Line of Kolkata Metro, located in B.B.D. Bagh. There are many British heritage buildings near the station with the Lal Dighi adjoining it. The tracks leaving the station towards Howrah go underneath the Hooghly River through the biggest underwater metro tunnel of India. The station was completed and opened on 6 March 2024. The station, though comparing without platform screen doors, may look similar to any Blue Line underground station, but it is actually very different as it is designed with world class facilities and murals that pay tribute to the locality and Indian freedom fighters. The nearest railway station is B.B.D. Bagh railway station. Just before the tunnel enters the underwater segment, lies a ventilation shaft on the Kolkata bank of Hooghly River, which is the deepest of its kind in India, at 44 metres (144 ft) below ground level.

== Station Layout ==
G	Street level	Exit/Entrance
L1	Concourse	Fare control, station agent, Ticket/token, shops
L2	Platform 1	Train towards Salt Lake Sector-V (Esplanade) →
L2	Island platform, Doors will open on the right
L2	Platform 2	← Train towards Howrah Maidan (Howrah)

== Entry/Exit gates ==
- A — Telephone Bhawan
- B — Writer's Building
- C — Lal Bazaar
- D — Currency Bhawan, B.B.D. Bagh

== Gallery ==
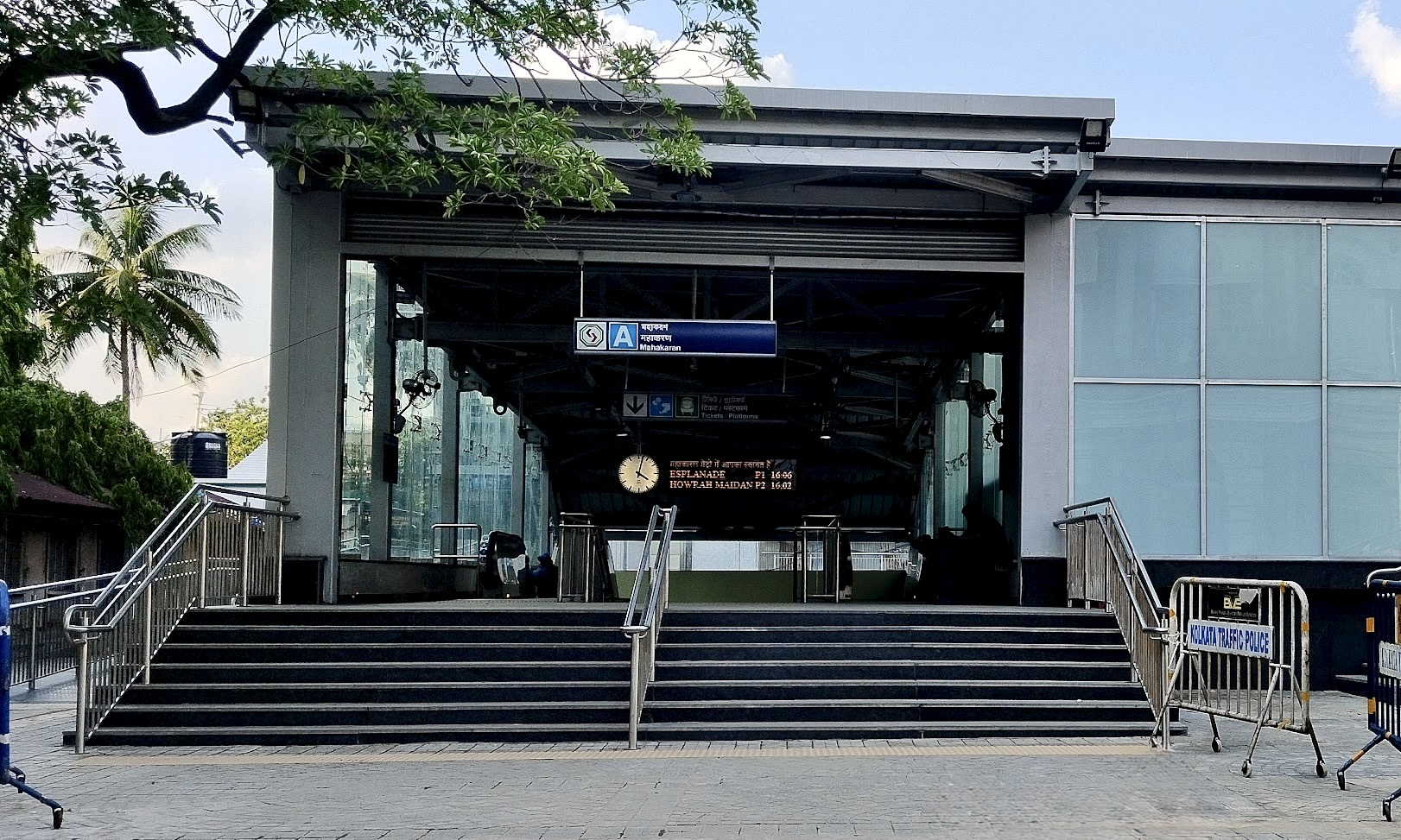
Entrance A

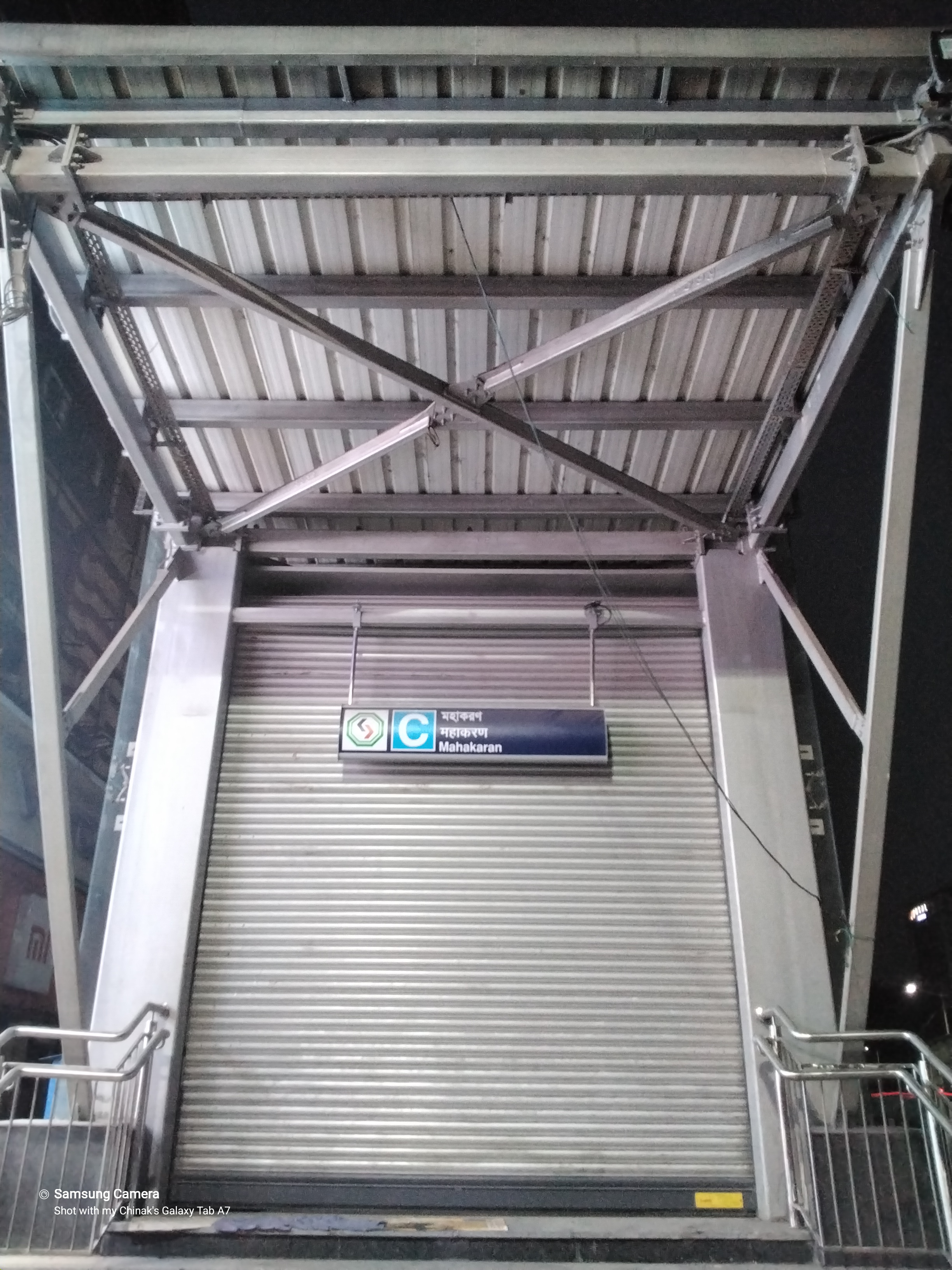
Entrance C

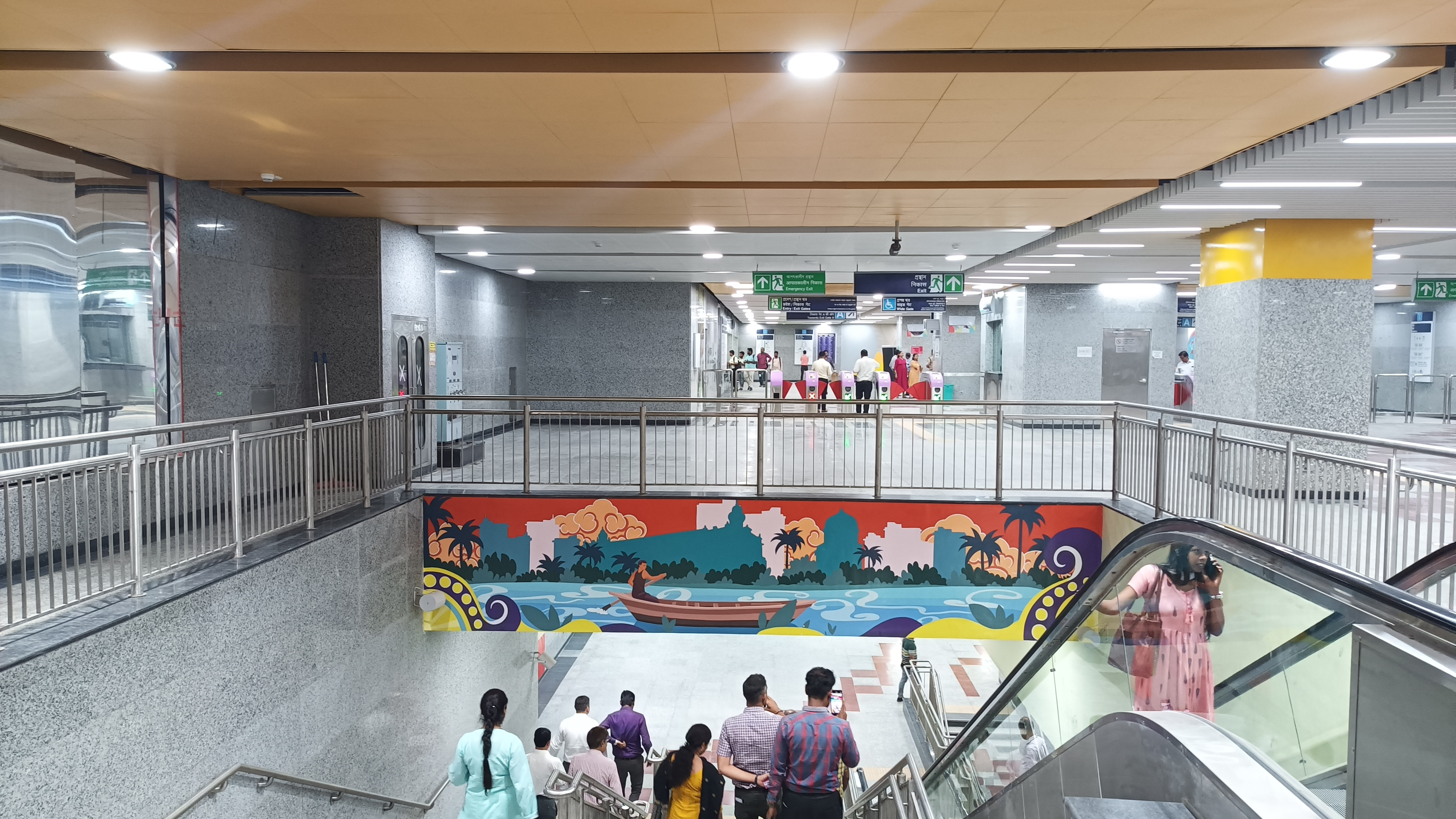
Concourse Area

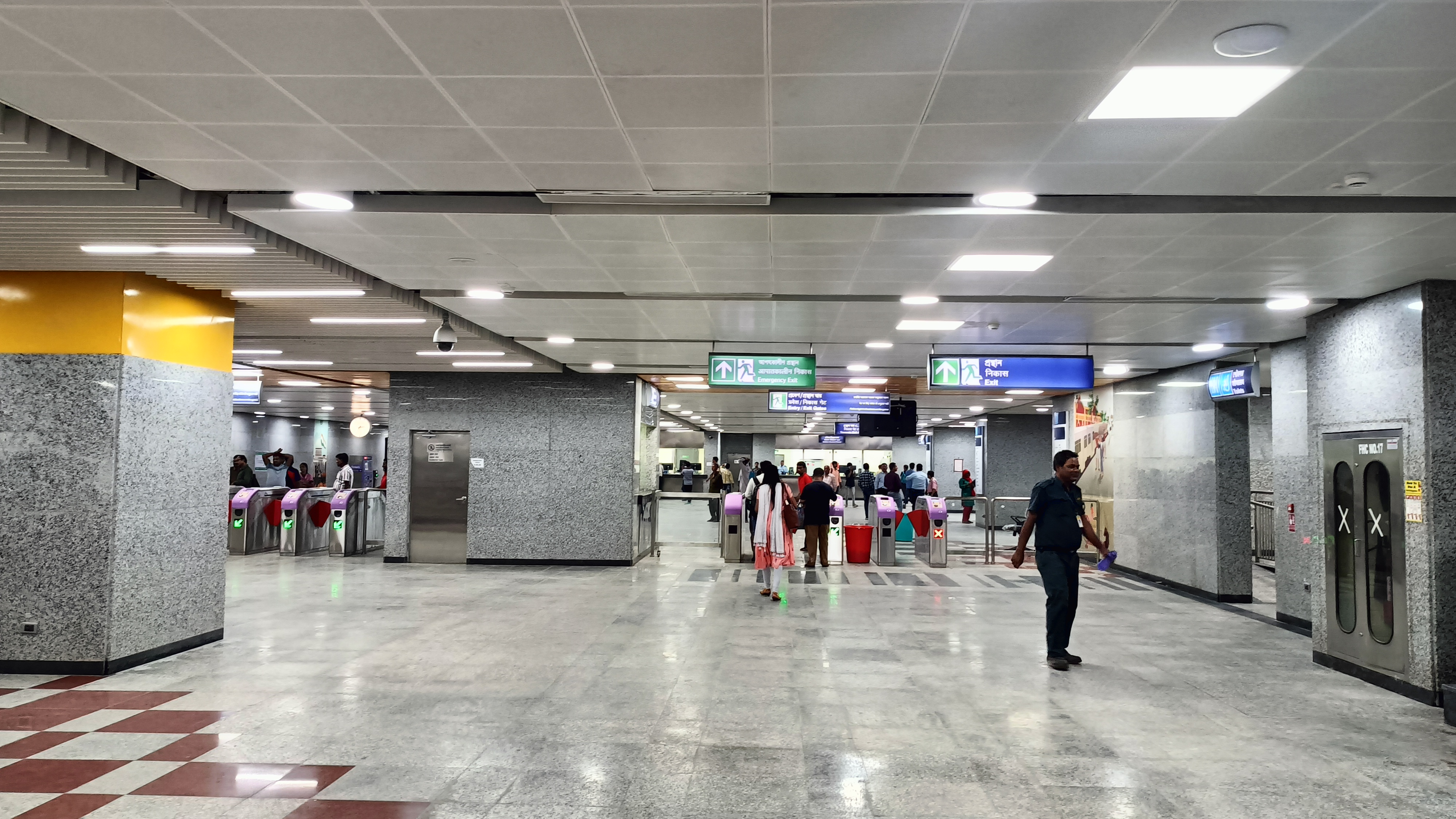
Concourse Area

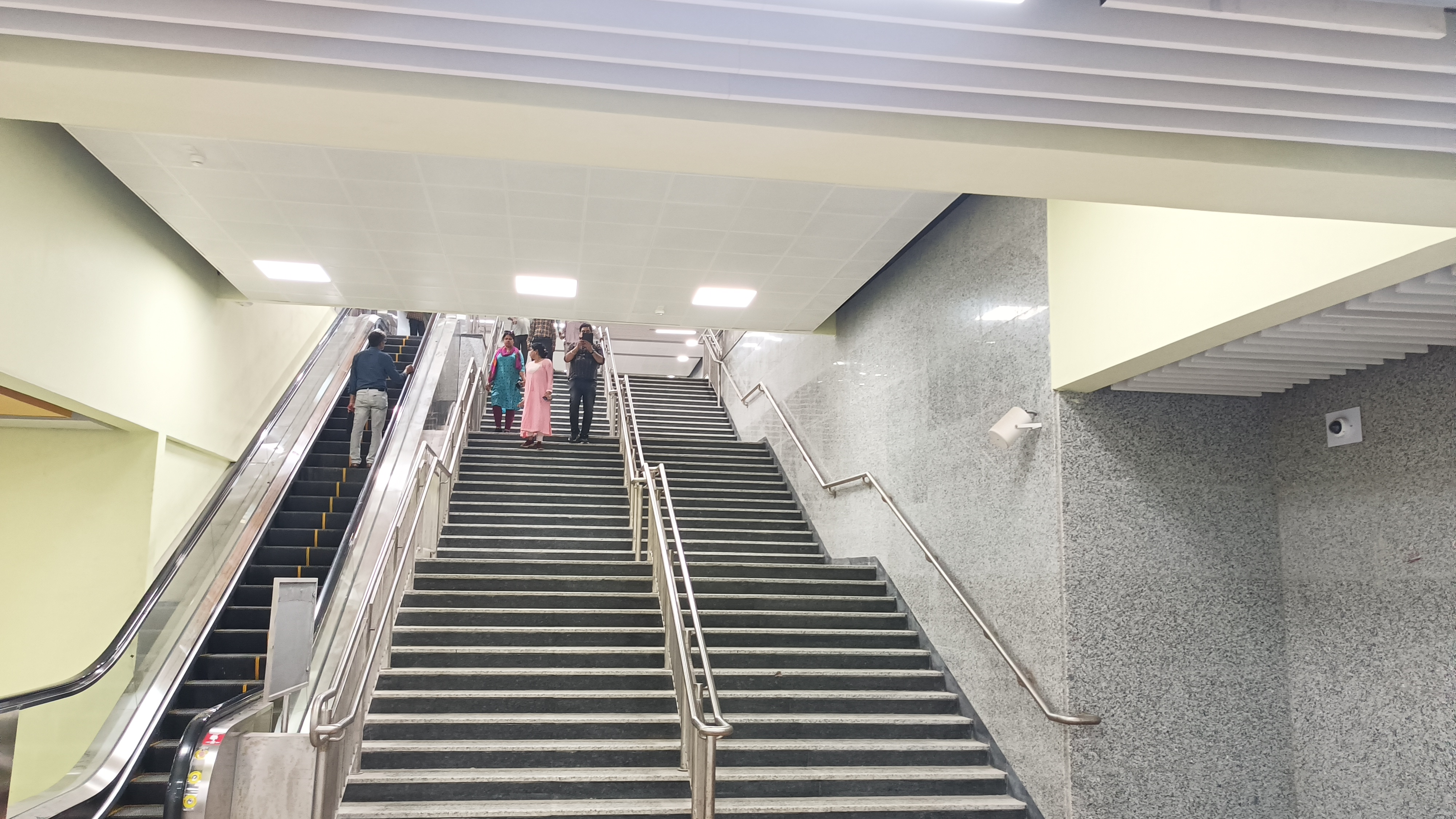
Stairways

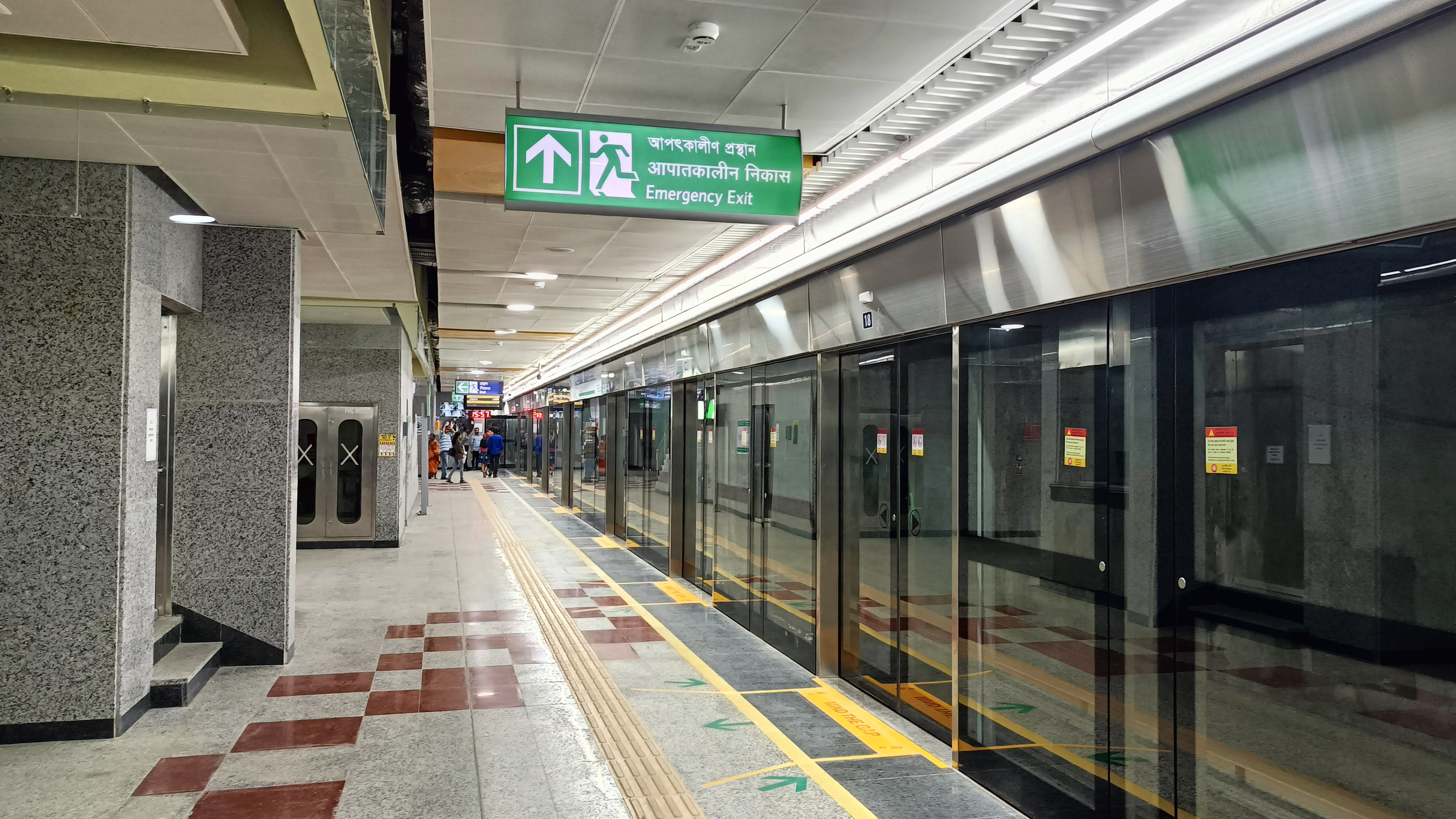
Platform level

== See also ==
- List of Kolkata Metro stations
