= Howrah metro station =

Metro station in Howrah, WB, India

Howrah
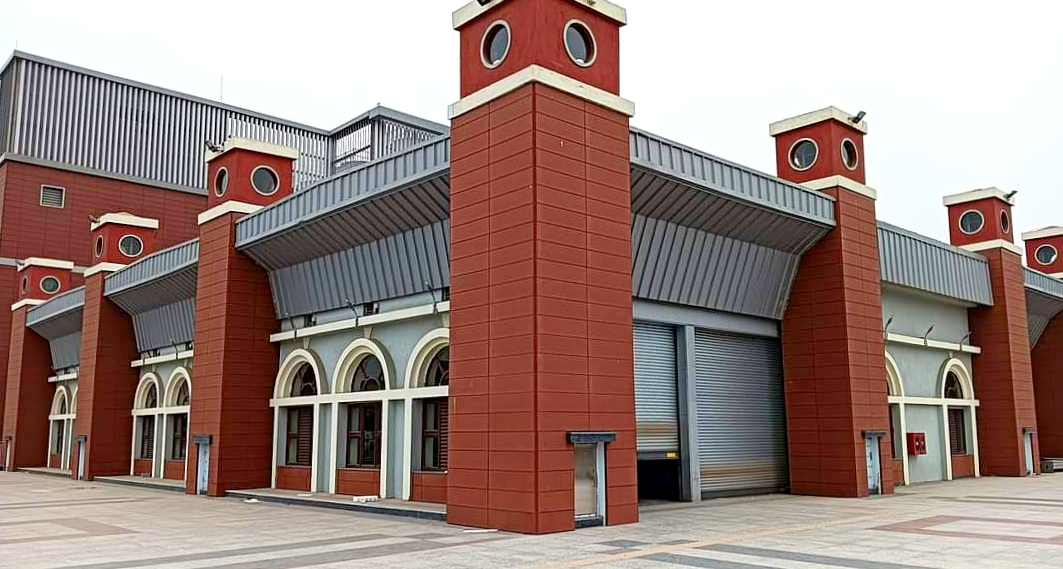
- Howrah railway station inspired station design

General information
- Location: Howrah railway station Howrah, West Bengal 711101; India
- Coordinates: 22.58336°N 88.34034°E
- System: Kolkata Metro
- Owner: Indian Railways
- Operator: Metro Railway, Kolkata
- Line: Green Line
- Platforms: Spanish solution (2 side platforms; 1 island platform)
- Tracks: 2
- Connections: Howrah: Eastern; South Eastern

Construction
- Structure type: Underground
- Depth: 34 m (112 ft)
- Parking: Yes
- Accessible: Yes
- Architect: Lee Harris Pomeroy Architects with SGI

Other information
- Status: Operational
- Station code: HWHM

History
- Opening: 6 March 2024; 2 years ago

Services
| Preceding station | Kolkata Metro | Following station |
|---|---|---|
| Howrah Maidan Terminus | Green Line | Mahakaran towards Salt Lake Sector-V |
Route map
Location

Howrah metro station is a metro station on Kolkata Metro's Green Line in Howrah, India. Built underneath Howrah railway station, the metro station allows interchanging with other zones of Indian Railways as part of the Howrah station transport hub. It is the deepest metro station in India. To the east, the station connects to Mahakaran station in Kolkata through India's biggest under-river metro tunnel beneath the Hooghly river; whilst to the west the adjacent station is Howrah Maidan.

== History ==
The master plan had already identified the East-West corridor back in 1971. It was planned to connect Howrah Railway Station with the Salt Lake region. As per the feasibility investigation for the corridor conducted by Pacific Consultant International Group in January 2004; their plan report proposed the route and tubular structures to be beneath the Hooghly River.

The Kolkata Metro Rail Corporation Limited (KMRC) was formed, to execute the operations of this line.After extensive work, the Esplanade–Howrah Maidan section of Green Line was inaugurated on 6 March 2024. The station gained attention for the underwater metro tunnel segment beneath the Hooghly River, which features illuminated sections visible to passengers during transit.

== Design and architecture ==
The station was designed based on projected peak-hour passenger traffic for the East–West Metro corridor.

Howrah metro station is an underground station constructed beneath the Howrah railway station complex as part of the East–West Metro corridor. Built at a depth of approximately 34 metres, it is the deepest metro station in India.

The station features a multi-platform arrangement following the Spanish solution, with a combination of side and island platforms designed to facilitate efficient passenger movement and reduce dwell times.

Its design is influenced by the need to handle high passenger volumes due to direct integration with one of India's busiest railway terminals, with vertical circulation systems such as escalators and lifts connecting concourse and platform levels.

=== Station Layout ===
| G | Street level | Exit/Entrance |
| L1 | Upper Concourse | Fare control, station agent, Ticket/token, shops |
| L2 | Mechanical level |
| L3 | Lower Concourse |
| L4 | Side platform, doors will open on the left |
| L4 | Platform 1A | 1B | Towards Salt Lake Sector-V (Mahakaran) → |
| L4 | Island platform, doors will open on both sides |
| L4 | Platform 2A | 2B | ← Towards Howrah Maidan (terminus) |
| L4 | Side platform, doors will open on left |

=== Entry/exits ===
- A/C – Howrah Station Old Complex
- B – Howrah Station New Complex

== Connections ==
Passengers can travel through the Kolkata Metro via interchanges on the rest of Green Line. The station is directly connected to both Howrah railway station complexes (being in middle of those complexes), allowing passengers to access both suburban, regional and long-distance services offered by Eastern Railway and South Eastern Railway via a subway leading to the complexes.

== Ridership and operations ==
Following the completion of the East–West Metro corridor in August 2025, Howrah metro station witnessed a significant increase in passenger footfall due to its direct integration with one of India's busiest railway terminals. The station recorded an average daily ridership of around 75,000 passengers, reflecting a modal shift from road-based transport such as buses and auto-rickshaws to the metro system. The surge in passenger volume also led to congestion during peak hours, affecting train dwell times and platform movement.

== Gallery ==
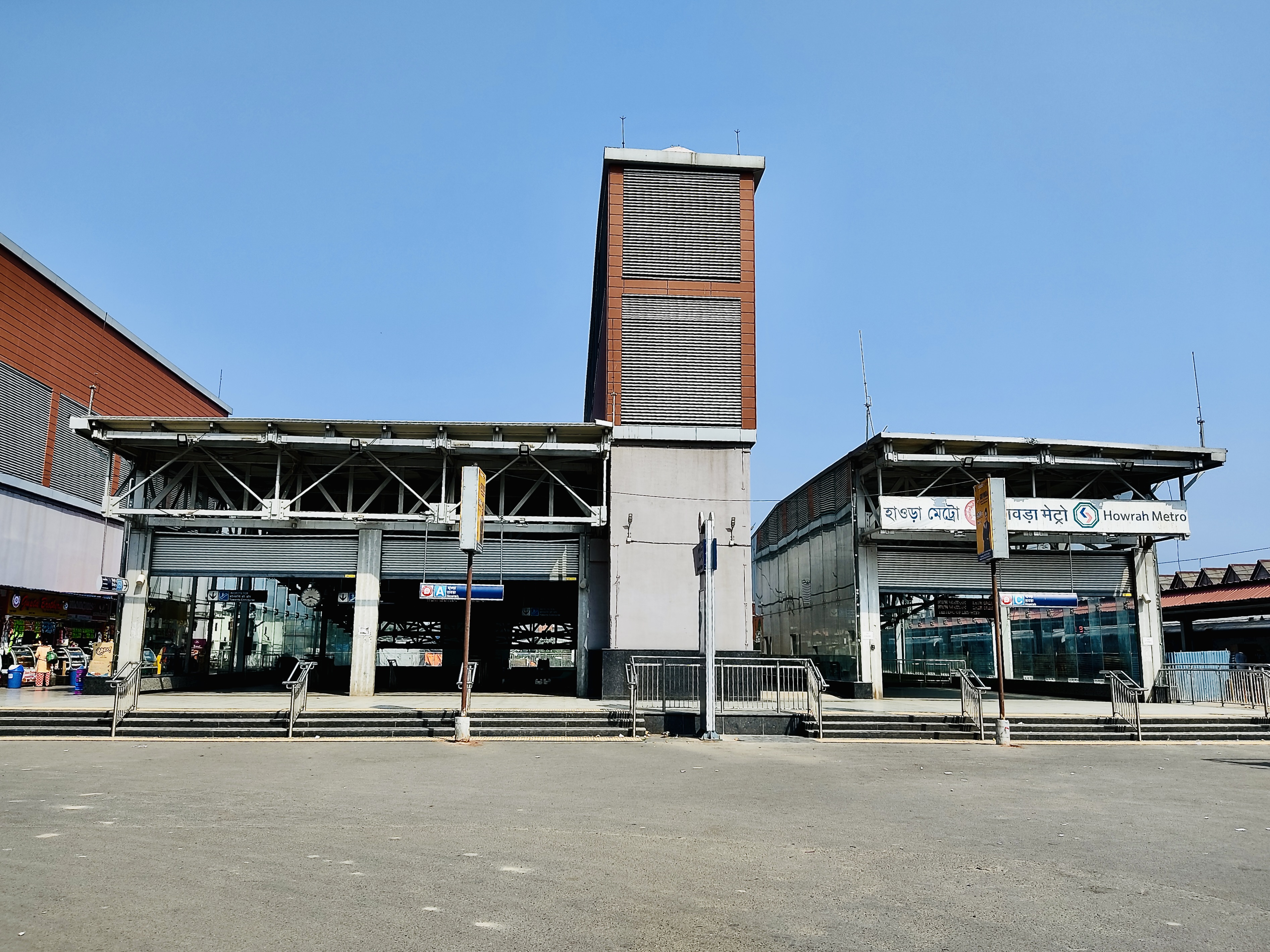
Entry gates A and C

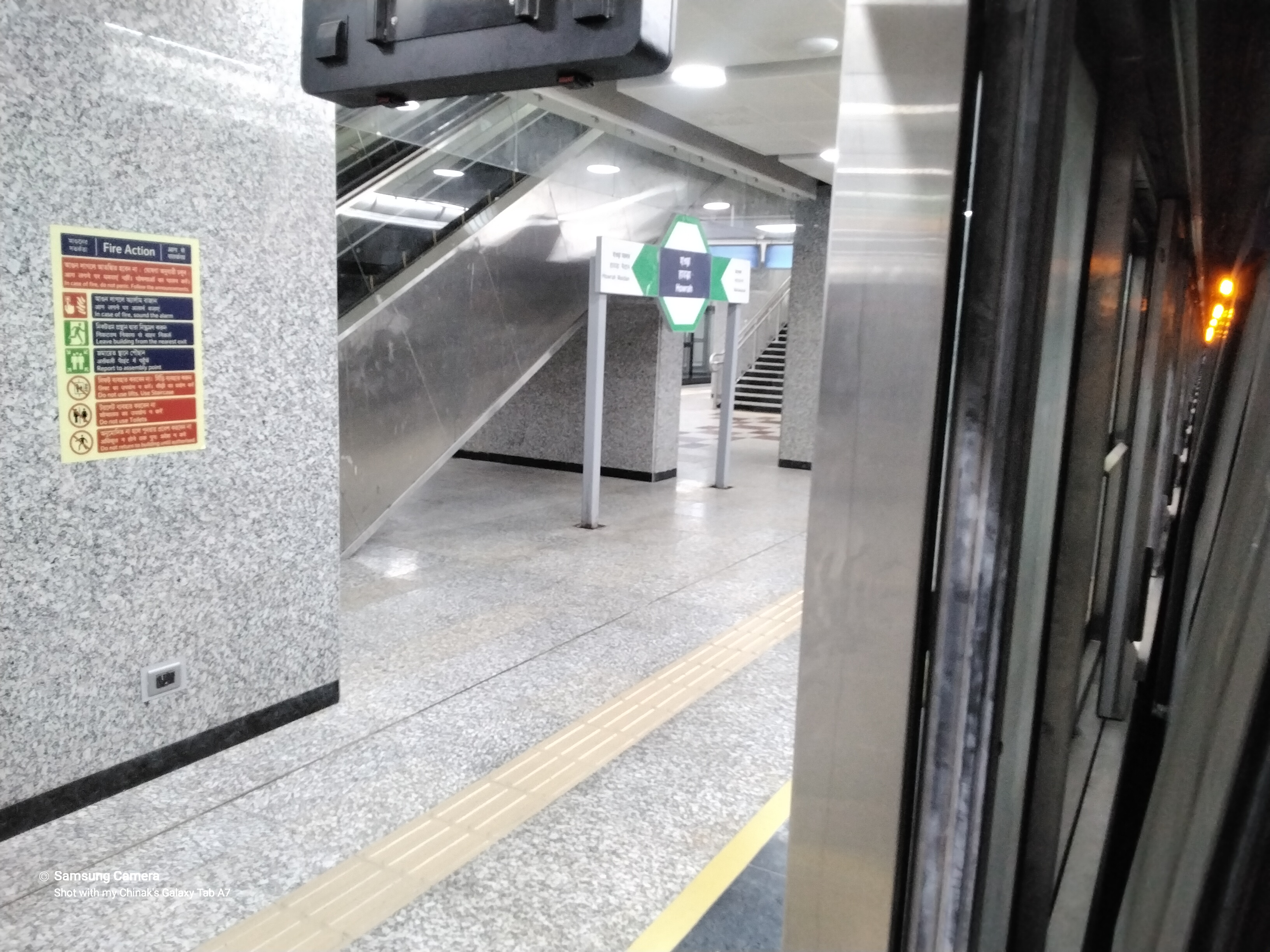
Platform level

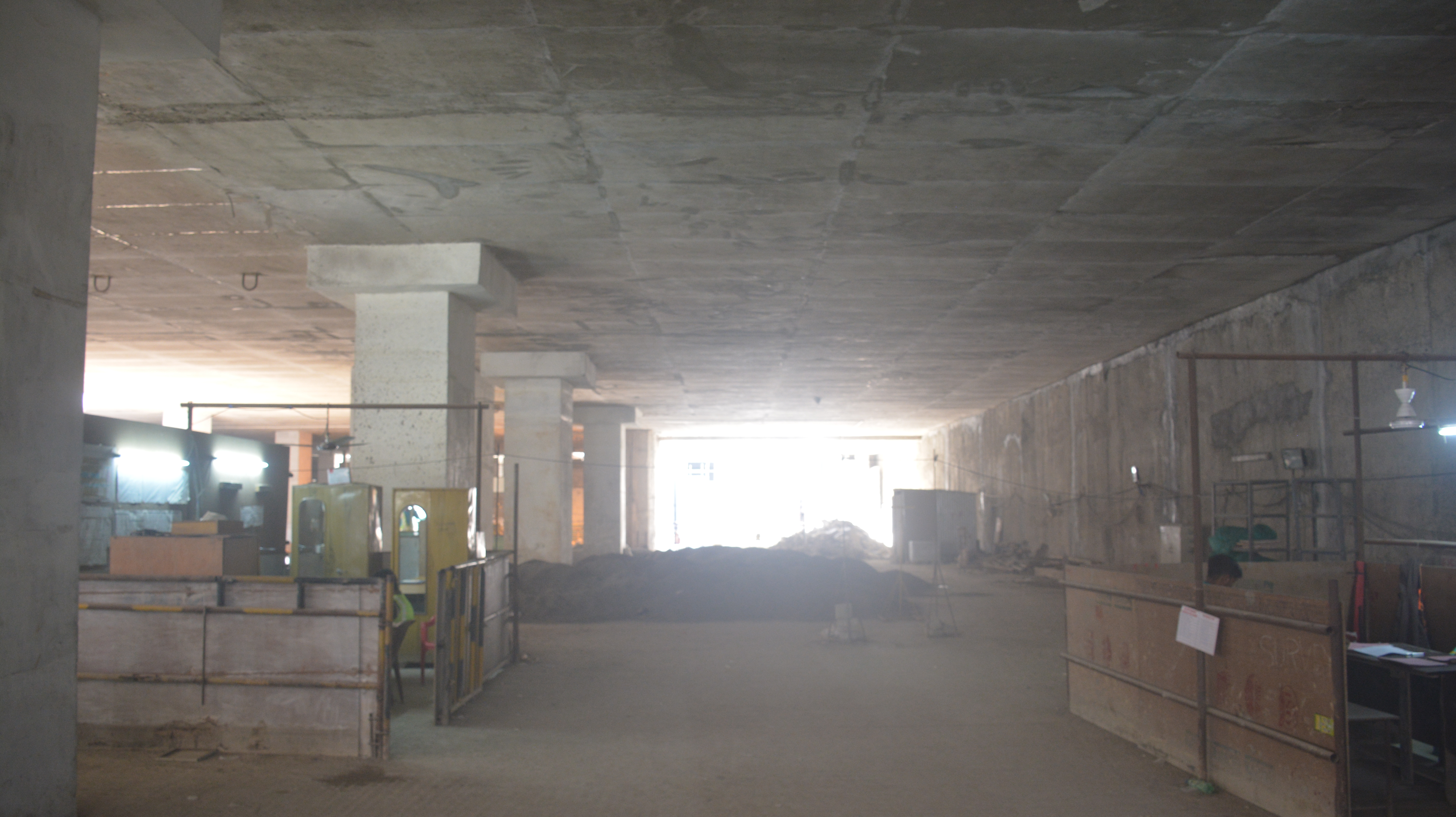
Concourse during construction

== See also ==
- Transport in Kolkata
- List of Kolkata Metro stations
- East West Metro Tunnel
- Kolkata Metro
