= Sealdah metro station =

Metro station in Kolkata, India

Sealdah
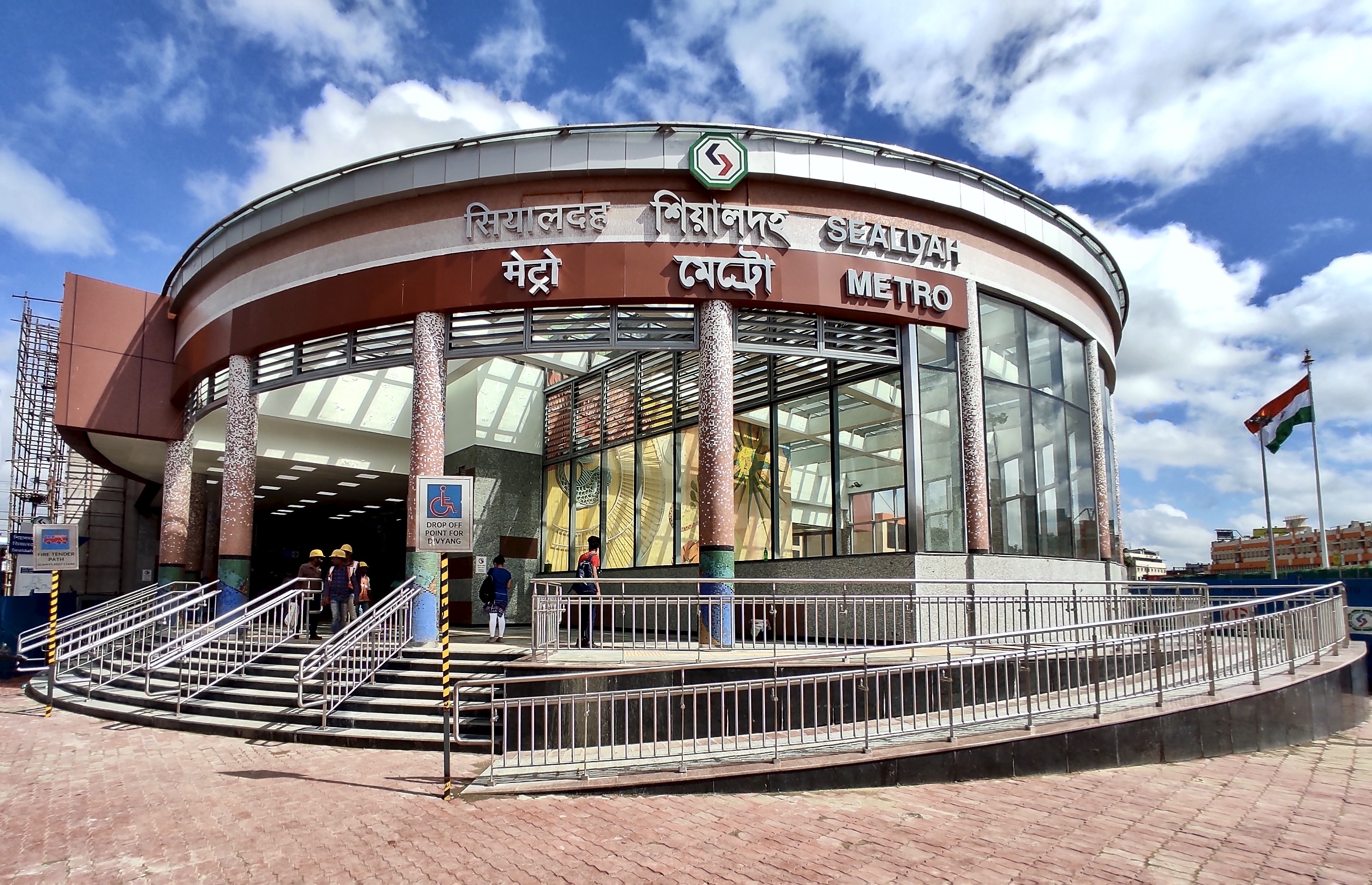
- Main exterior of the Sealdah metro station

General information
- Location: Sealdah Station Rd, Sealdah; Rajabazar, Kolkata, West Bengal 700009; India
- Coordinates: 22.56641°N 88.37002°E
- System: Kolkata Metro
- Owner: Indian Railways
- Operator: Metro Railway, Kolkata
- Line: Green Line
- Platforms: Spanish solution (2 side platforms; 1 island platform)
- Tracks: 2
- Connections: Sealdah: Eastern; Chord link; Sealdah South

Construction
- Structure type: Underground
- Depth: 16 m (52 ft)
- Parking: Yes
- Cycle facilities: No
- Accessible: Yes
- Architect: Lee Harris Pomeroy Architects with SGI

Other information
- Status: Operational
- Station code: SDHM

History
- Opened: 11 July 2022; 4 years ago

Services
Preceding station	Kolkata Metro	Following station
Esplanade towards Howrah Maidan	Green Line	Phoolbagan towards Salt Lake Sector-V
Route map
Location

Sealdah (also known as DTDC Sealdah for sponsorship reasons) is an important underground metro station on the East-West corridor of the Green Line of Kolkata Metro, located in Sealdah, Kolkata. The underground station adjoins with Sealdah railway station of the Indian Railways on its eastern side. The Sealdah Court is on the west side of the station, the Sealdah Flyover (Vidyapati Setu) is on the northern side of the station. There is a pedestrian subway linking the metro station with the railway station.

== Inauguration ==
In March 2022, the Commissioner of Railway Safety gave his approval for the commencement of commercial operations at this station and the station was likely to be inaugurated on the occasion of Poila Baisakh on 15 April 2022. However, the inauguration on the Poila Baisakh could not happen as some issues pointed out by the Commissioner of Railway Safety, were yet to be fixed. After missing a few deadlines, the Station was ultimately inaugurated by the Union Minister Smriti Irani on 11 July 2022, with the commercial run beginning on 14 July 2022. The station was connected to Esplanade on 22 August 2025.

== Layout ==
G	Street level	Exit/Entrance
L1	Concourse	Fare control, station agent, Ticket/token, shops
L2	Side platform, Door will open on the left
L2	Platforms 1A / 1B	Train towards Salt Lake Sector-V (Phoolbagan) →
L2	Island platform, Door will open on both sides
L2	Platforms 2A/2B	← Train towards Howrah Maidan (Esplanade)
L2	Side platform, Door will open on the left

== Connections ==
=== Rail ===
It is directly connected to the Sealdah railway station.

== Gallery ==
More photos on commons:Category:Sealdah_metro_station

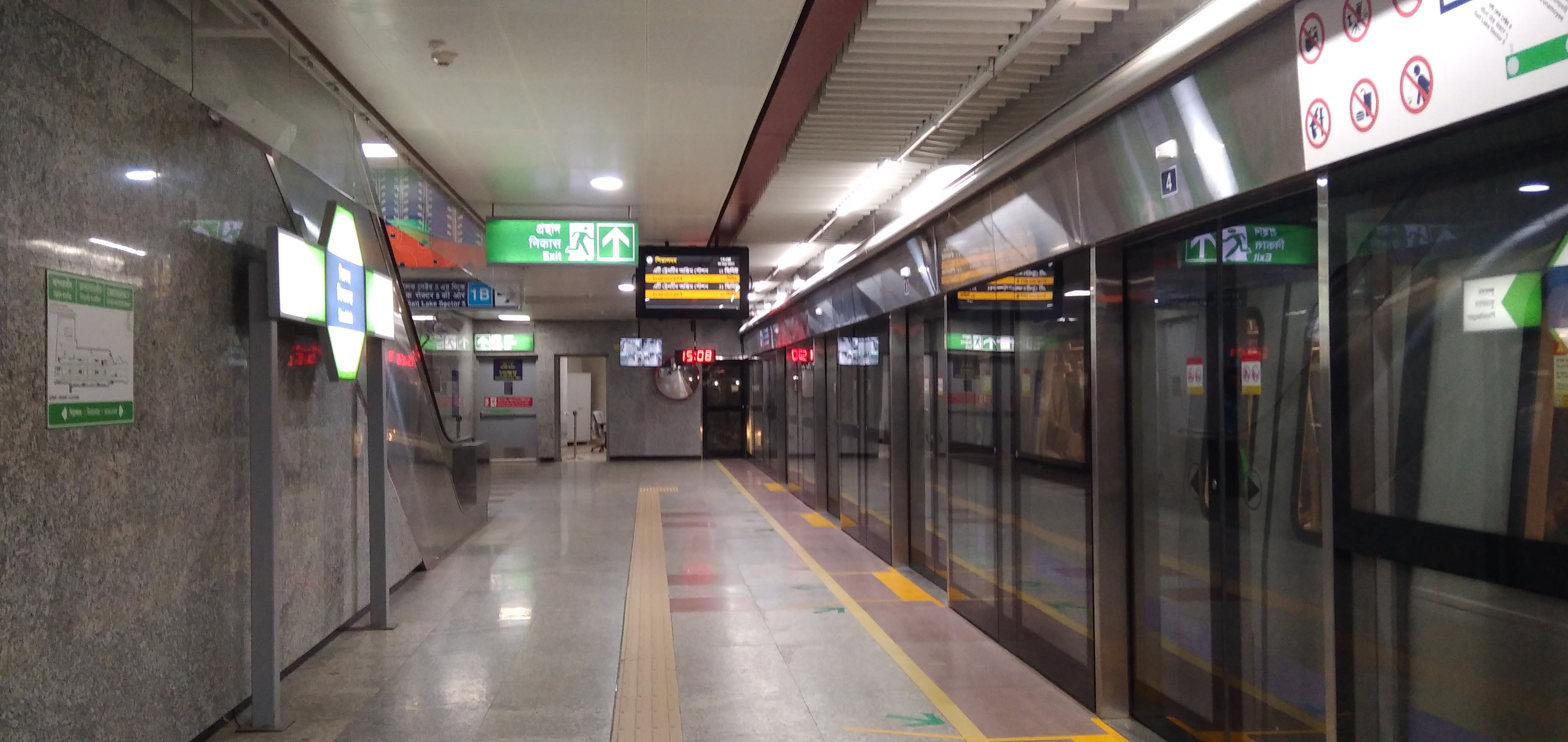
1B platform

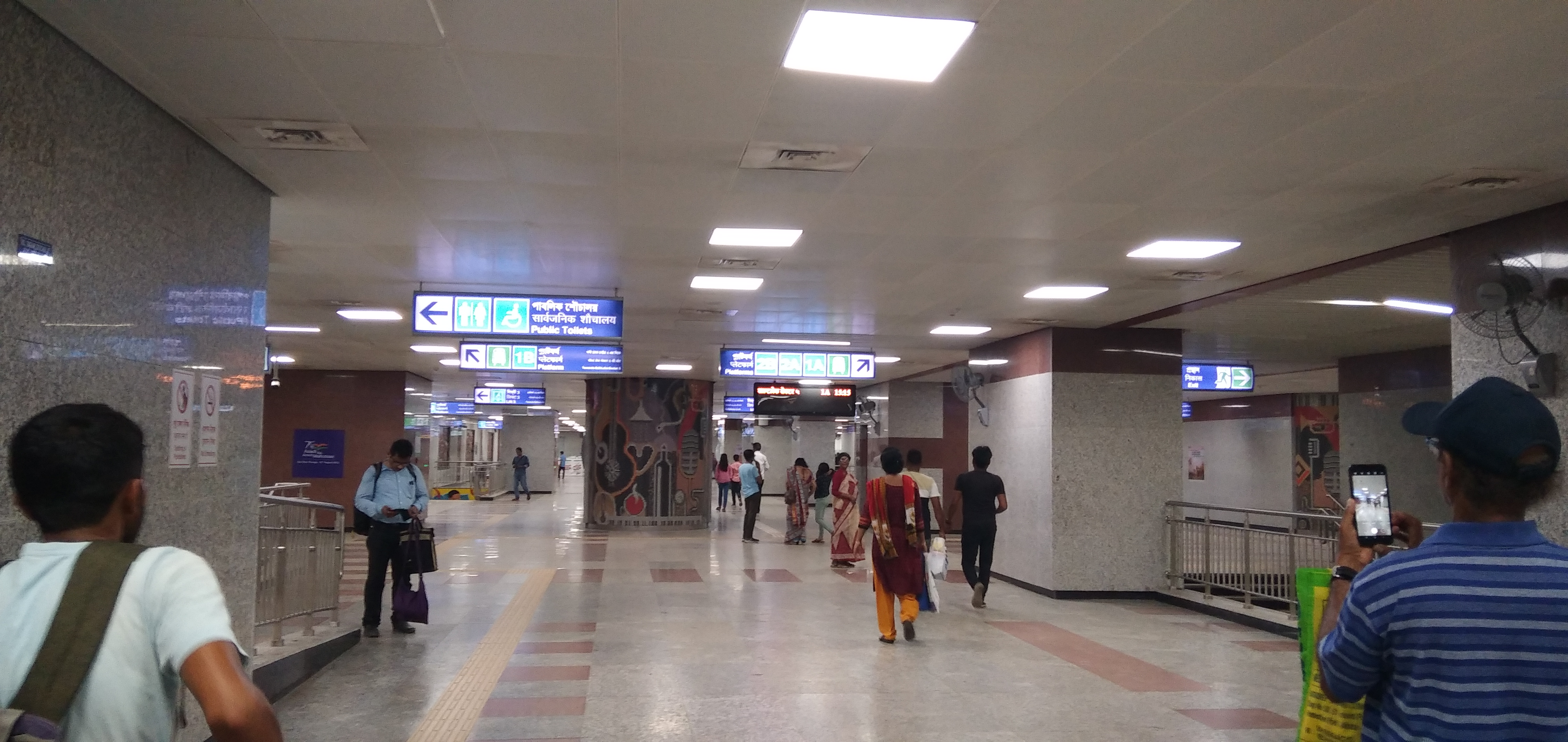
Concourse area

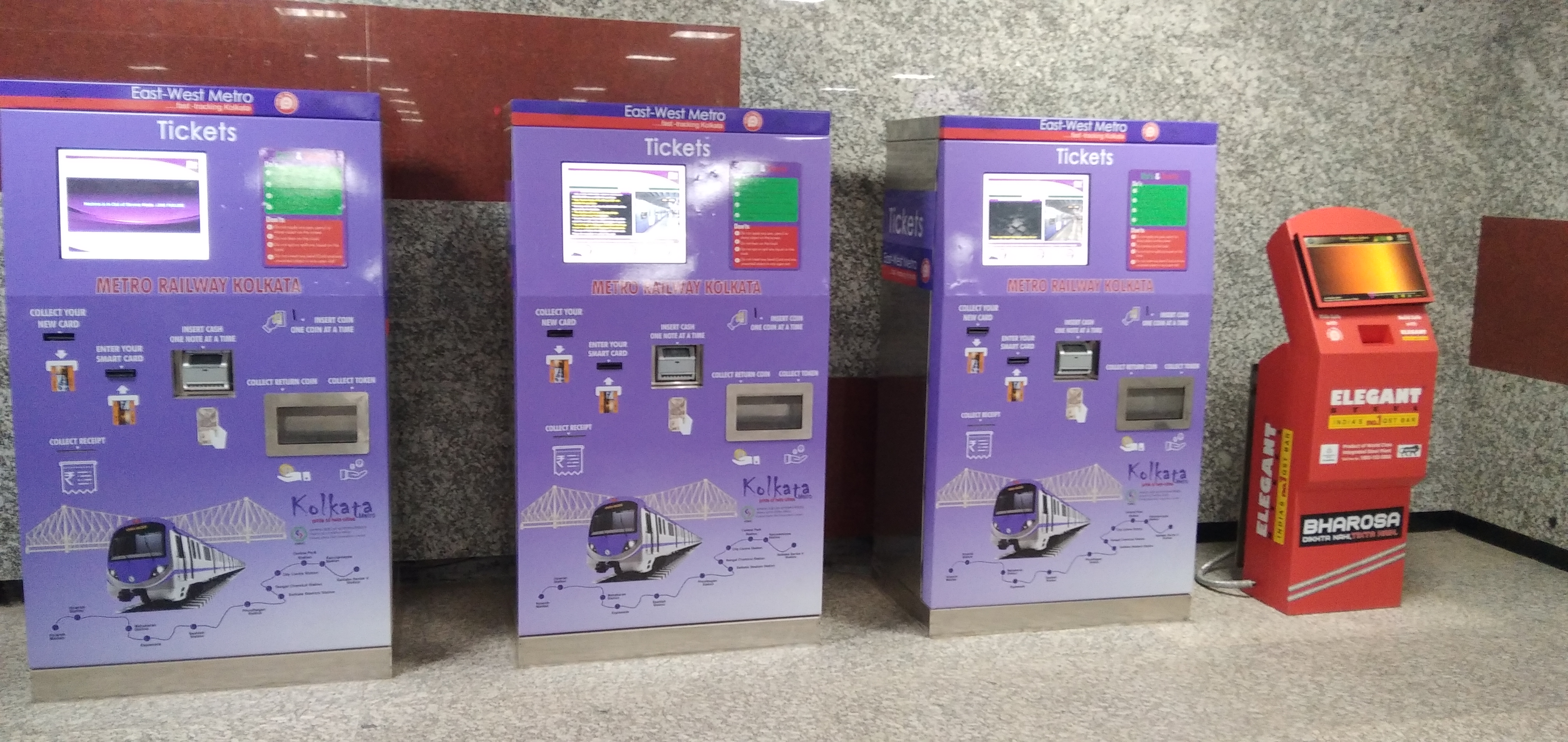
Automated ticket vending machines

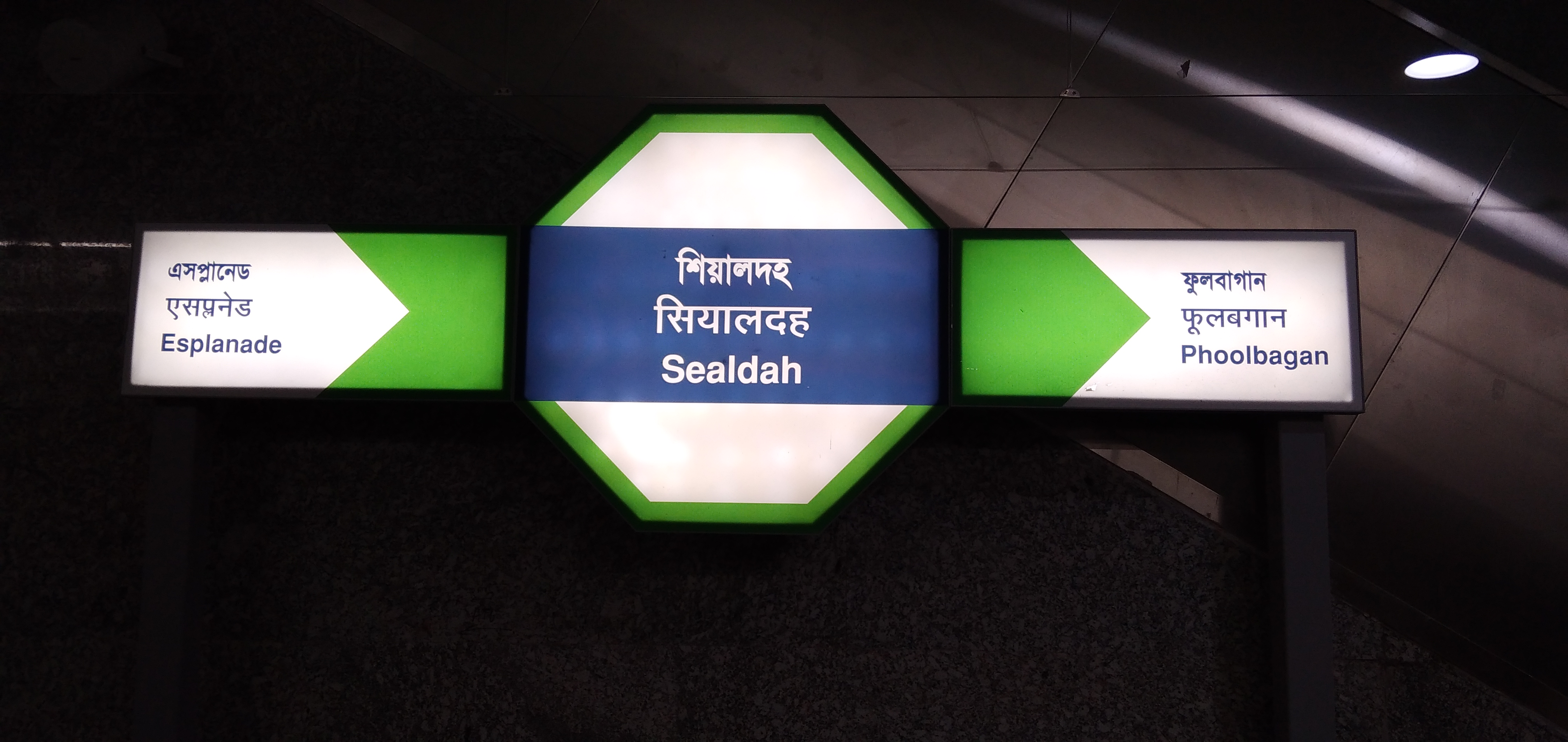
Station Name Plate

== See also ==
- Transport in Kolkata
- List of Kolkata Metro stations
- East West Metro Tunnel
- Kolkata Metro
