= Howrah Maidan metro station =

Metro station in Howrah, India

Howrah Maidan
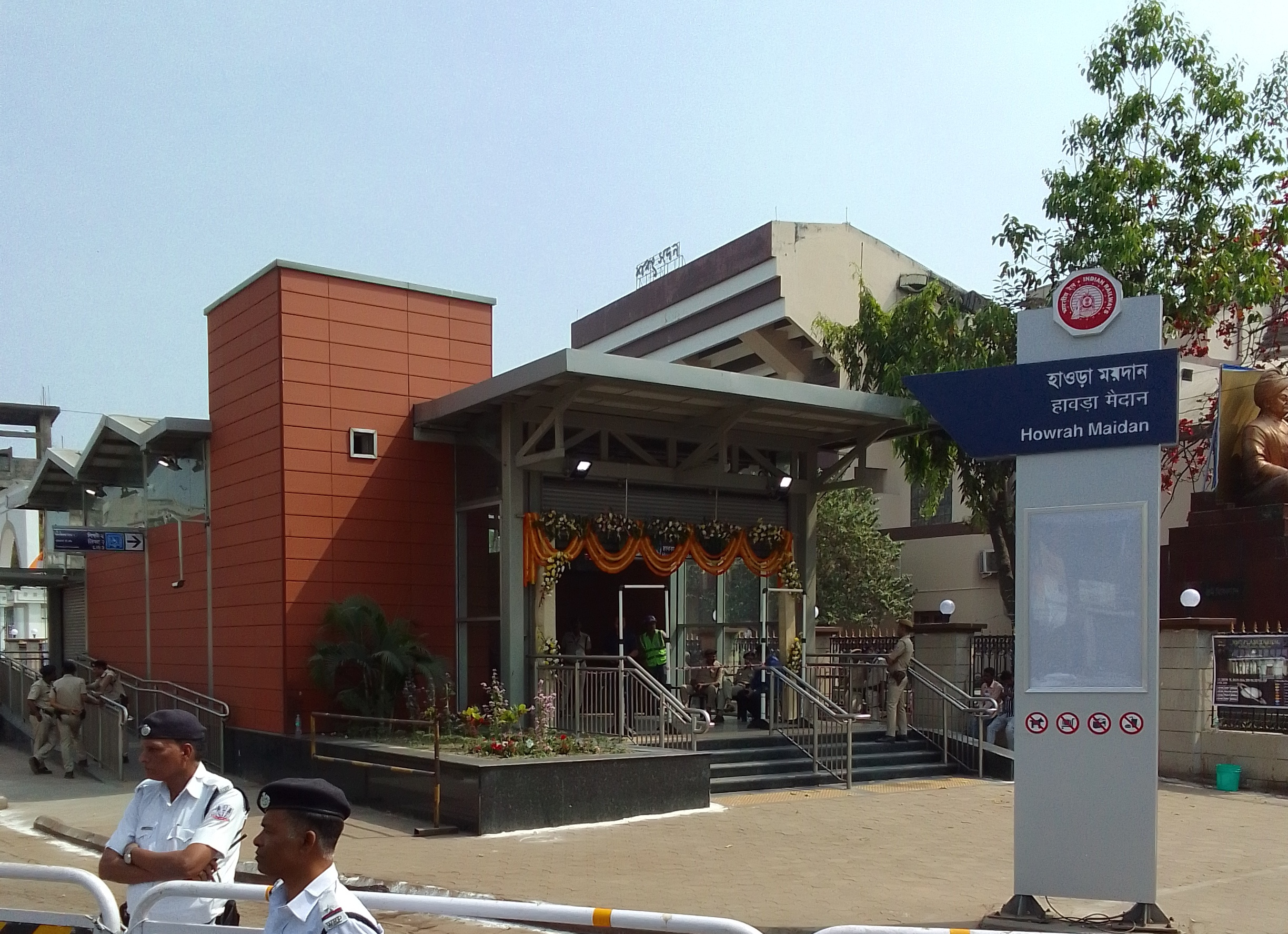
- Entrance A of the metro station

General information
- Location: Howrah Maidan, Grand Trunk Road; Howrah, West Bengal 711101; India
- Coordinates: 22.58385°N 88.33399°E
- System: Kolkata Metro
- Operator: Metro Railway, Kolkata
- Line: Green Line
- Platforms: 2 (1 island platform)
- Tracks: 2

Construction
- Structure type: Underground
- Accessible: Yes
- Architect: Lee Harris Pomeroy Architects with SGI

Other information
- Status: Operational
- Station code: HWMM

History
- Opened: 6 March 2024; 2 years ago

Services
Preceding station	Kolkata Metro	Following station
Terminus	Green Line	Howrah towards Salt Lake Sector-V
Route map
Location

Howrah Maidan Metro Station is the terminal station of Kolkata Metro's Green Line in Howrah Maidan, Howrah, India. The underground station is located near the Howrah Municipal Corporation Stadium and the Howrah Sarat Sadan. The station was completed and inaugurated on 6 March 2024. Though being similar to any Blue Line underground station, it is made with world class amenities and patronage to football, the main sport of the state.

== Station Layout ==
G	Street level	Exit/Entrance
L1	Concourse	Fare control, station agent, Ticket/token, shops
L2	Platform 1	Towards Salt Lake Sector-V (Howrah) →
L2	Island platform, doors will open on the right
L2	Platform 2	Towards Salt Lake Sector-V (Howrah) →

== Entry/Exit ==
- A – Sarat Sadan
- B – Bangabashi More

== Gallery ==
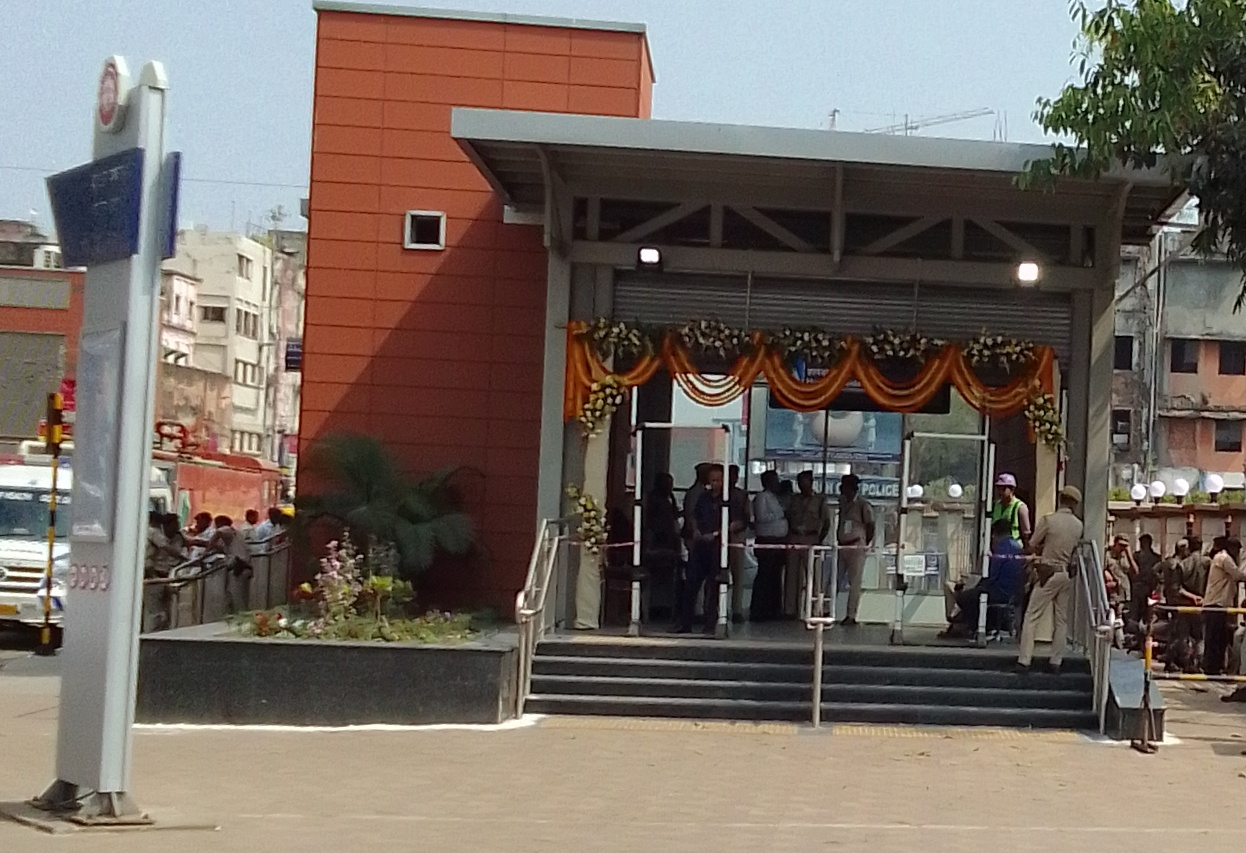
Station Entrance

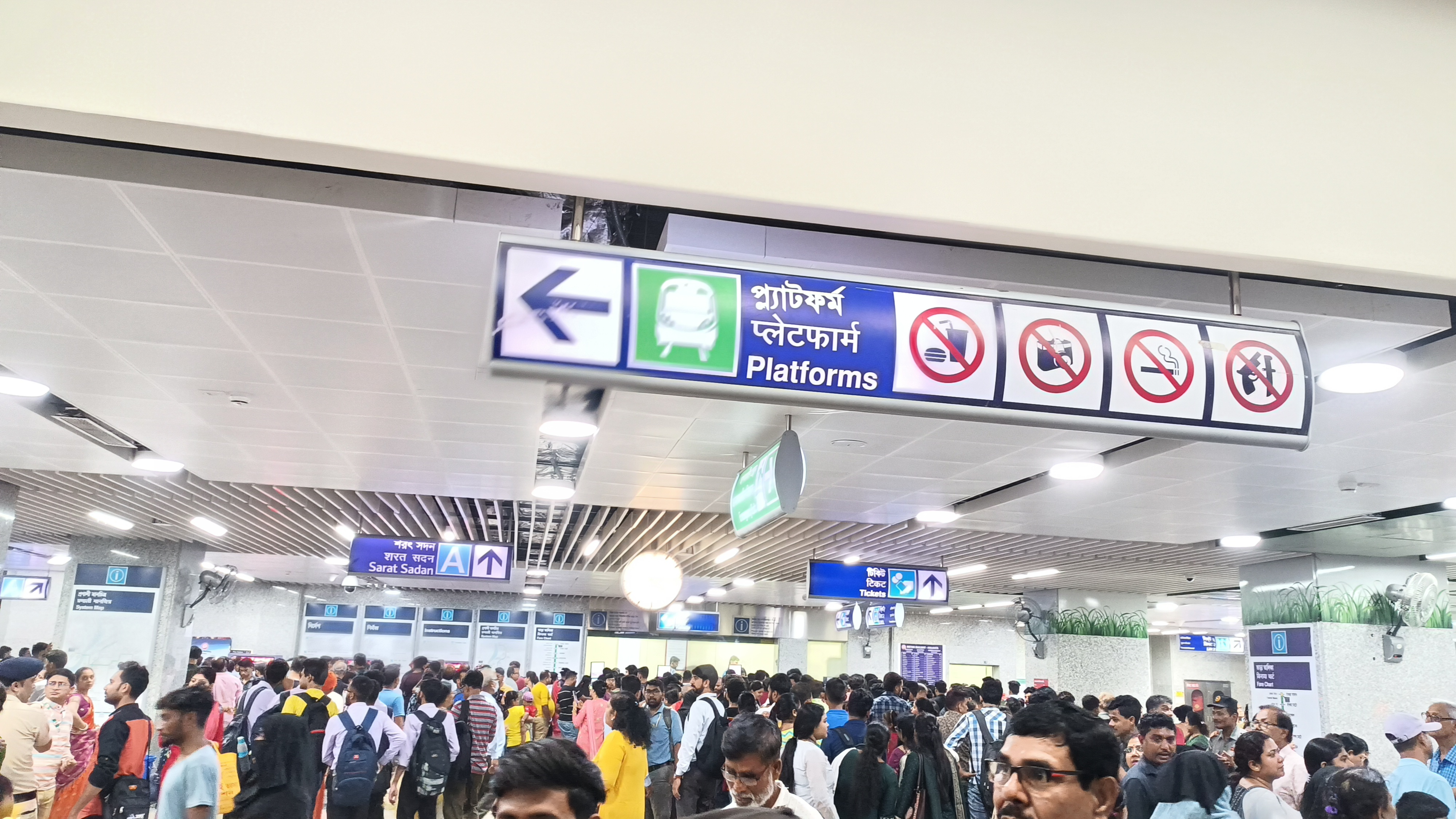
Concourse Area

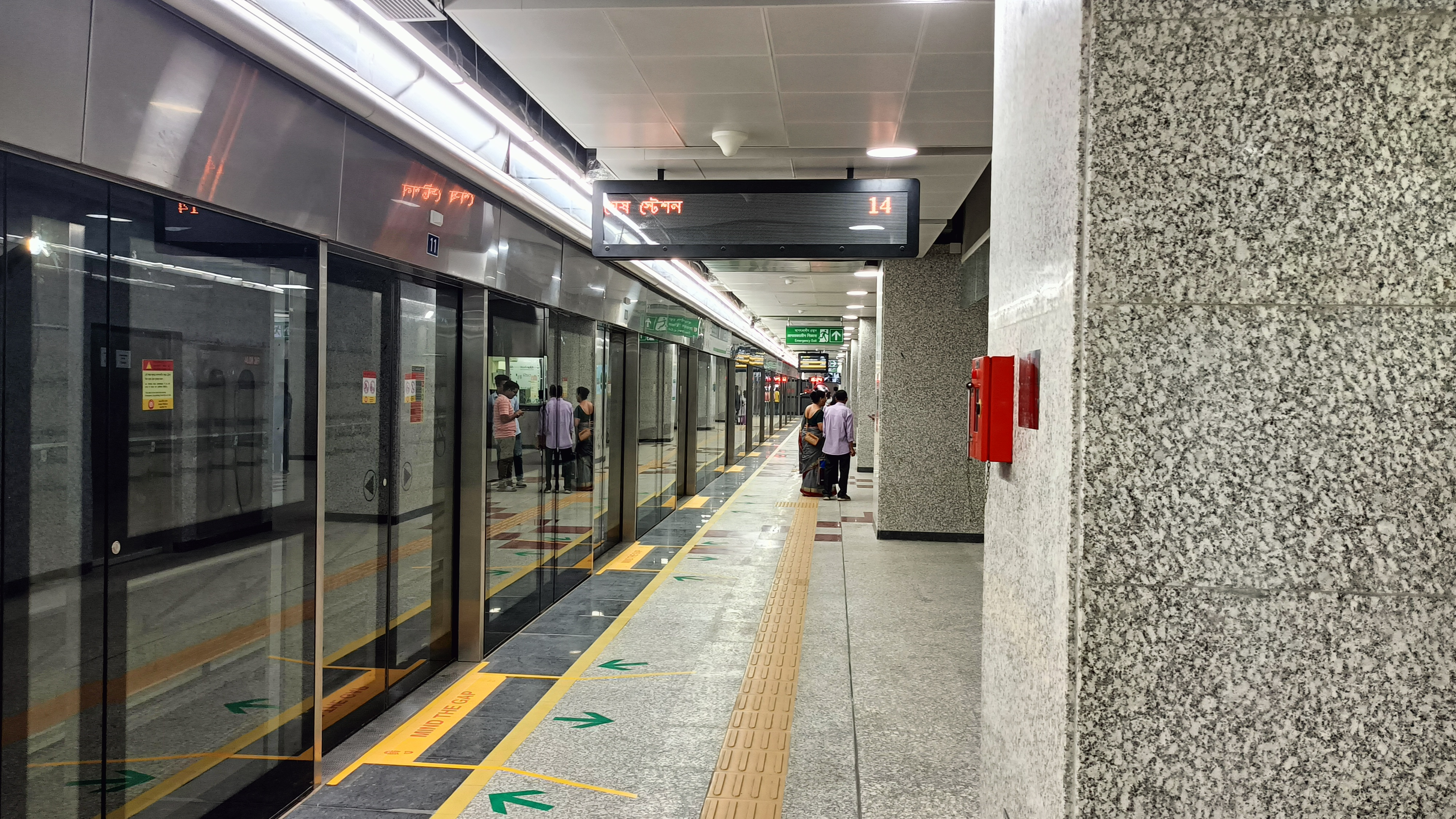
Howrah Maidan metro station platform views from right

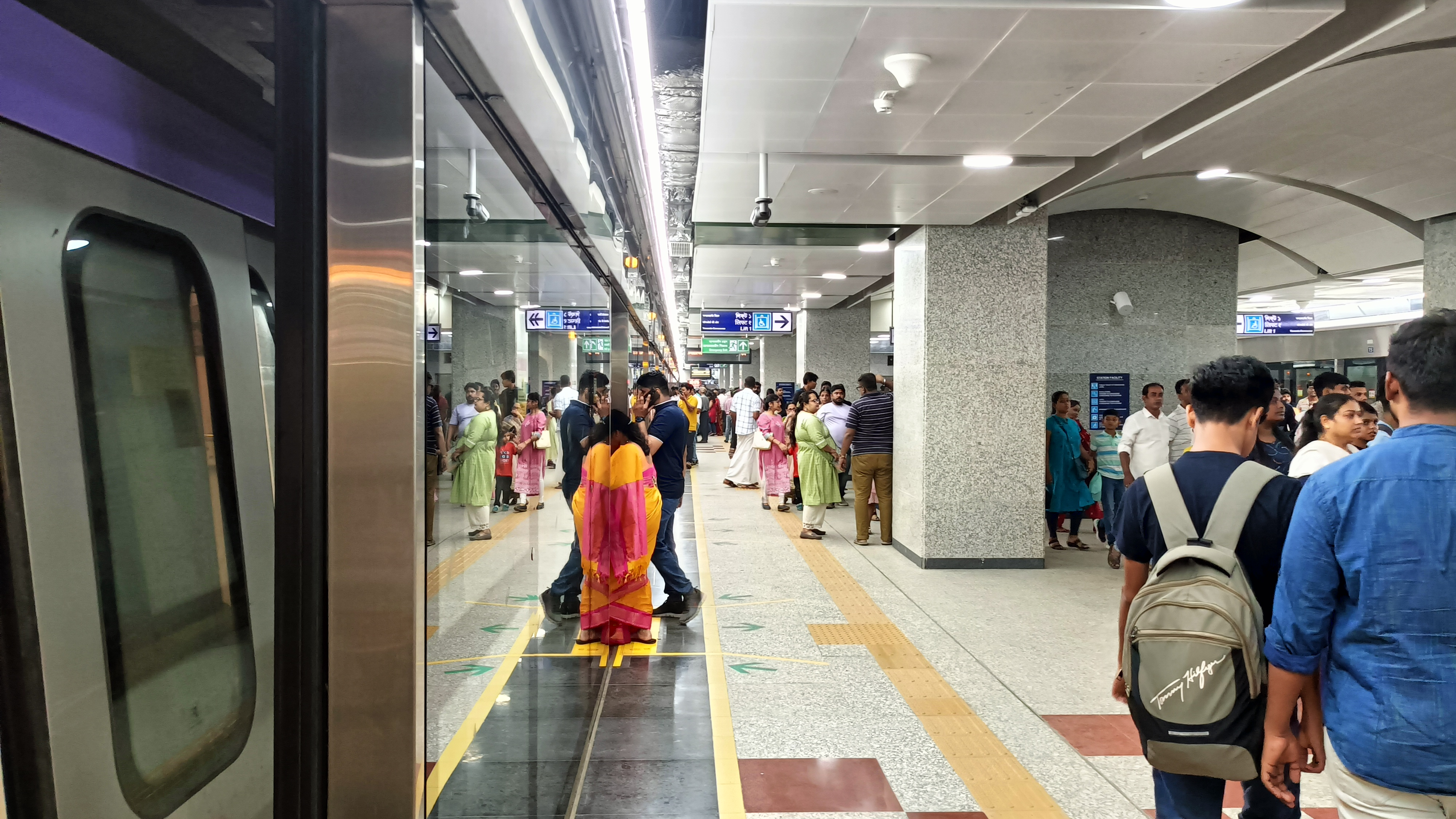
Howrah Maidan metro station platform views from left

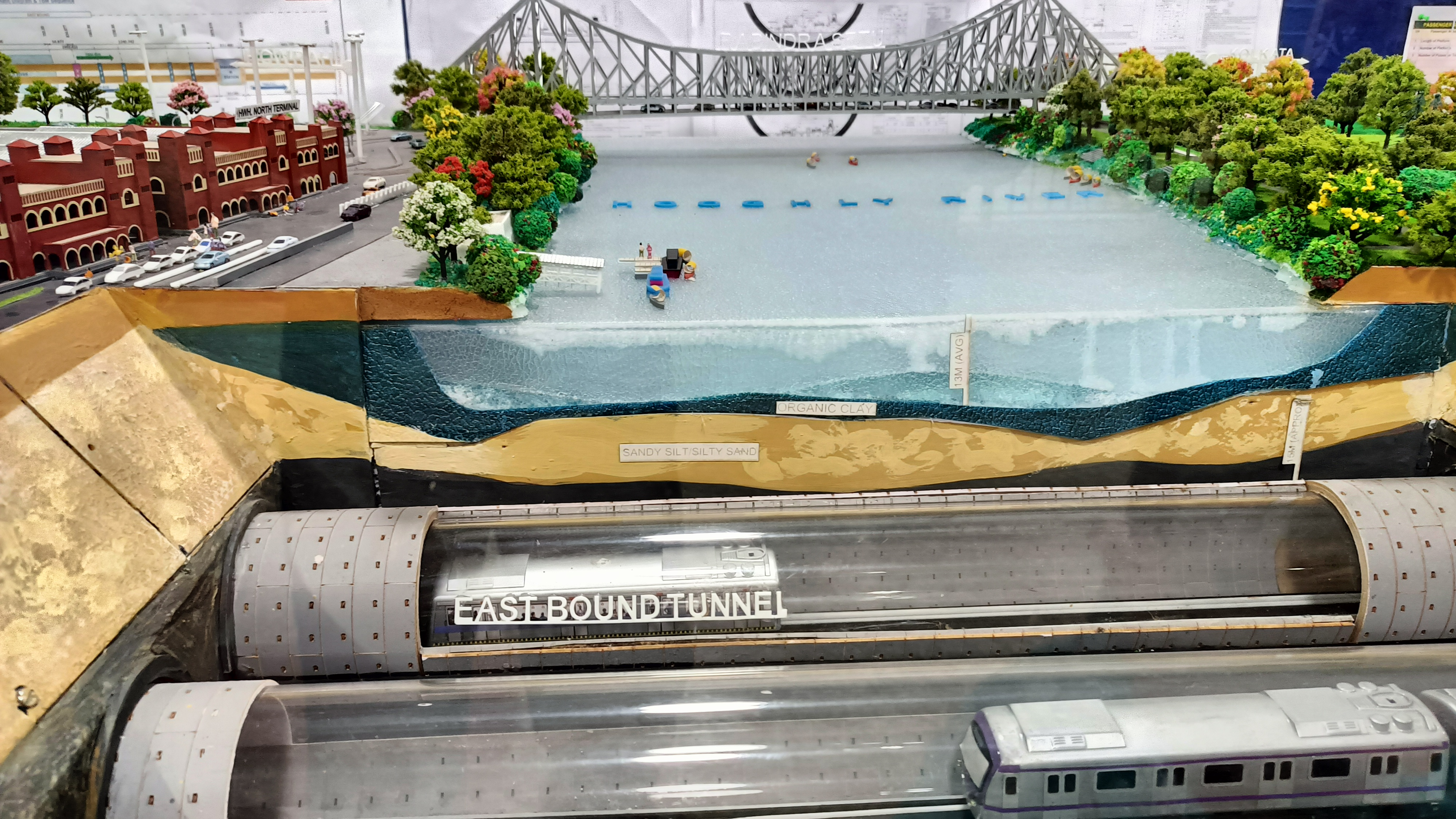
East West Metro line Model 1

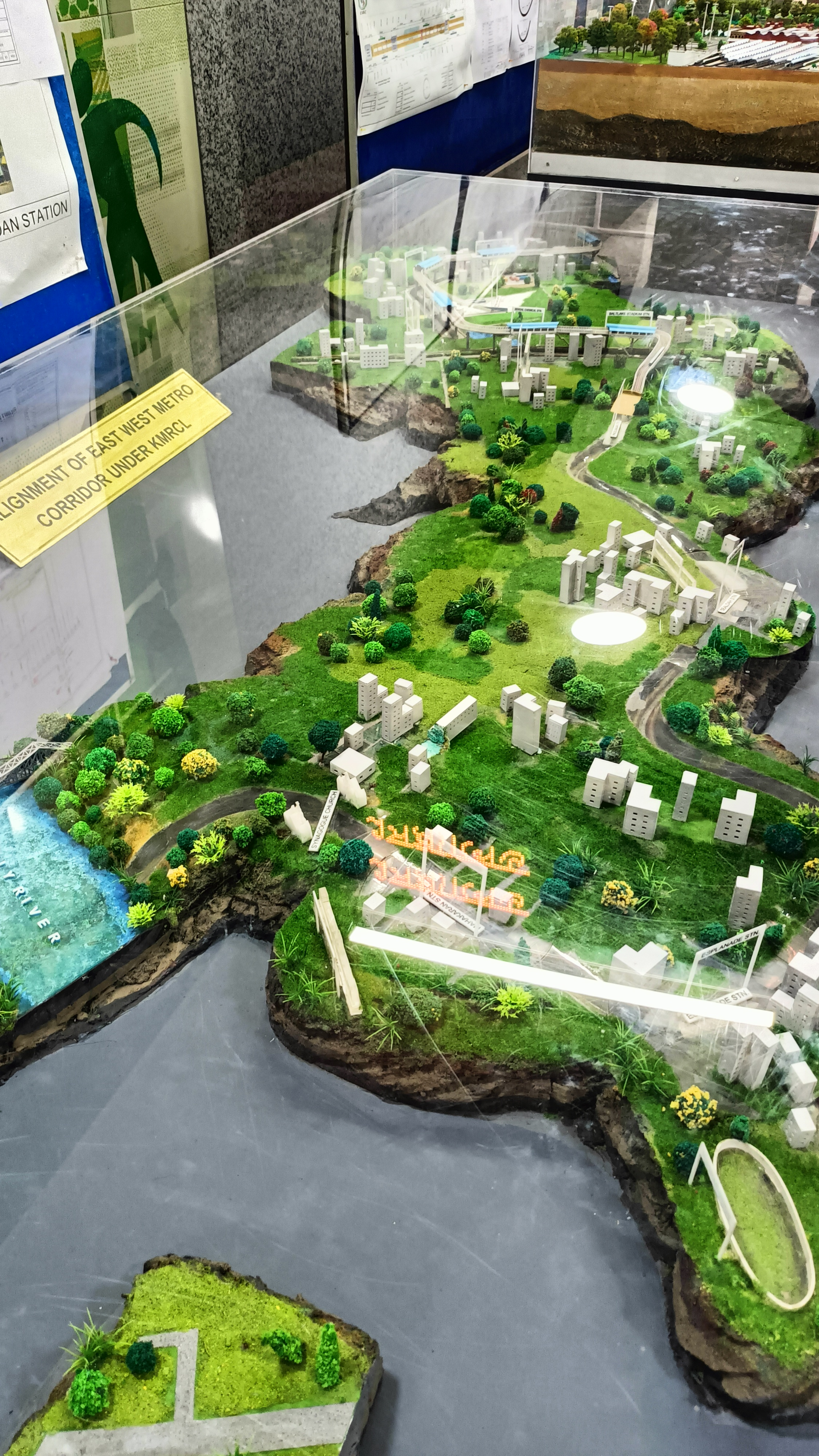
East West Metro line Model 2

== See also ==
- List of Kolkata Metro stations
- Transport in Kolkata
