= Sarat Bose Road =

Road in Kolkata, India

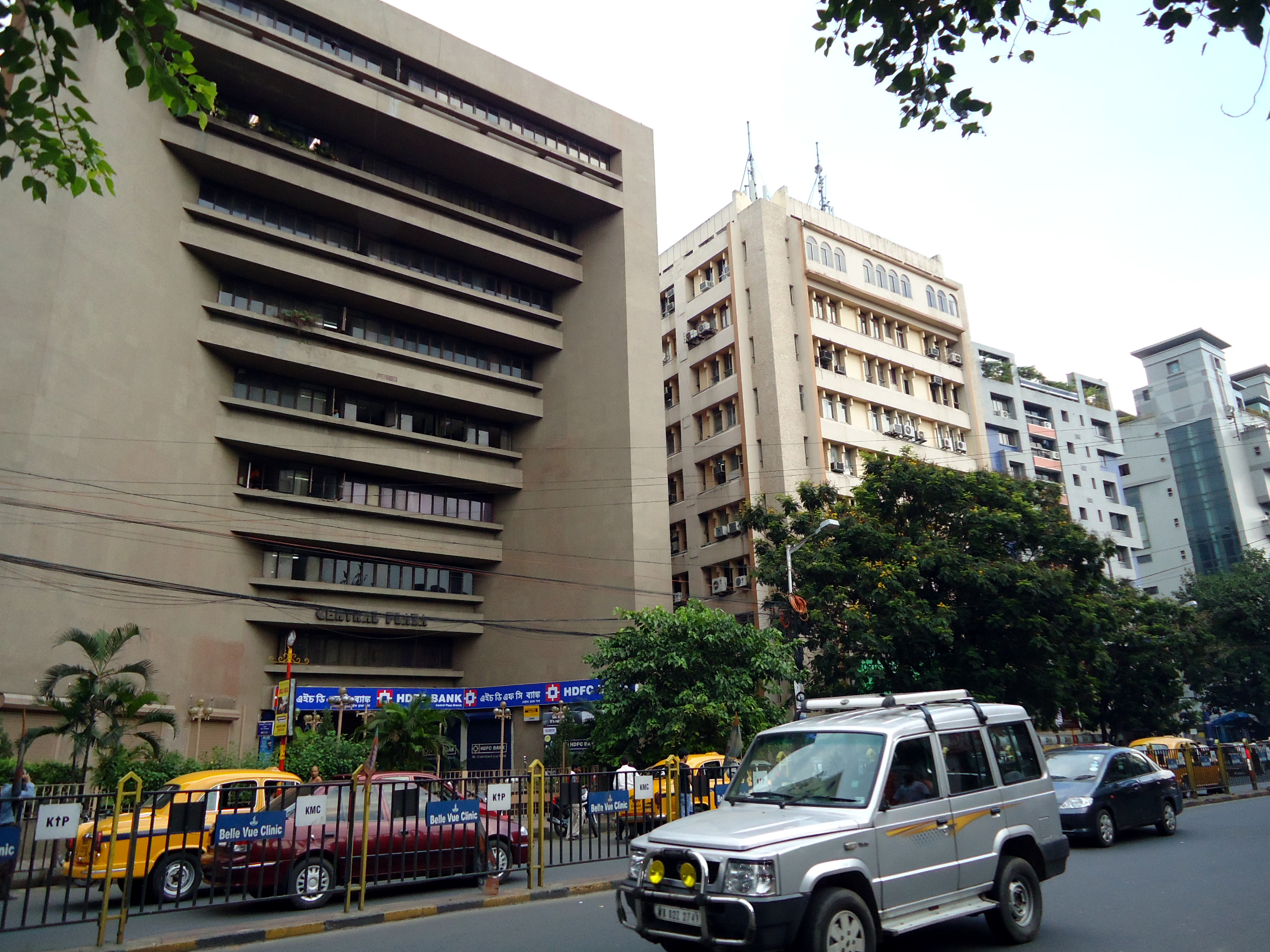
- Sarat Bose Road near Minto Park
- Former name: Lansdowne Road
- Maintained by: Kolkata Municipal Corporation
- Length: 3.5 km (2.2 mi)
- Location: Kolkata, India
- Nearest Kolkata Metro station: Rabindra Sadan; Netaji Bhavan; Jatin Das Park; Kalighat
- north end: Minto Park
- south end: Rabindra Sarobar Stadium

Sarat Bose Road (previously known as Lansdowne Road) is a 3.5 km long road in southern part of Kolkata, India. The 4 laned road connects Southern Avenue (near Rabindra Sarobar Stadium) with AJC Bose Road (at Minto Park) and separates two major localities of Ballygunge and Bhawanipore.

== Localities ==
Sarat Bose Road runs north to south almost parallel to Shyama Prasad Mukherjee Road and Gariahat Road. It starts from the Rabindra Sarobar Stadium (Lake Stadium) on the south and moves almost vertically up intersecting other major thoroughfares like Lake Road, Rash Behari Avenue, and Hazra Road just up a few blocks from Ramakrishna Mission Seva Pratishthan, proceeds up north with the famous Lansdowne Market and Padmapukur Square on the left, intersects Chakraberia Road and finally winds its way through Elgin Road, Diocesan High School and ends after meeting AJC Bose Road at Minto Park. It also intersects the smaller arterial roads of Raja Basanta Roy Road, Dr. Sarat Banerjee Road, Manoharpukur Road, Beltala Road, Padmapukur Road, Mahendra Road and Rowland Road. The entire stretch of Sarat Bose Road is a mix of commercial and shopping zones as well as residential zones.

== Landmarks ==
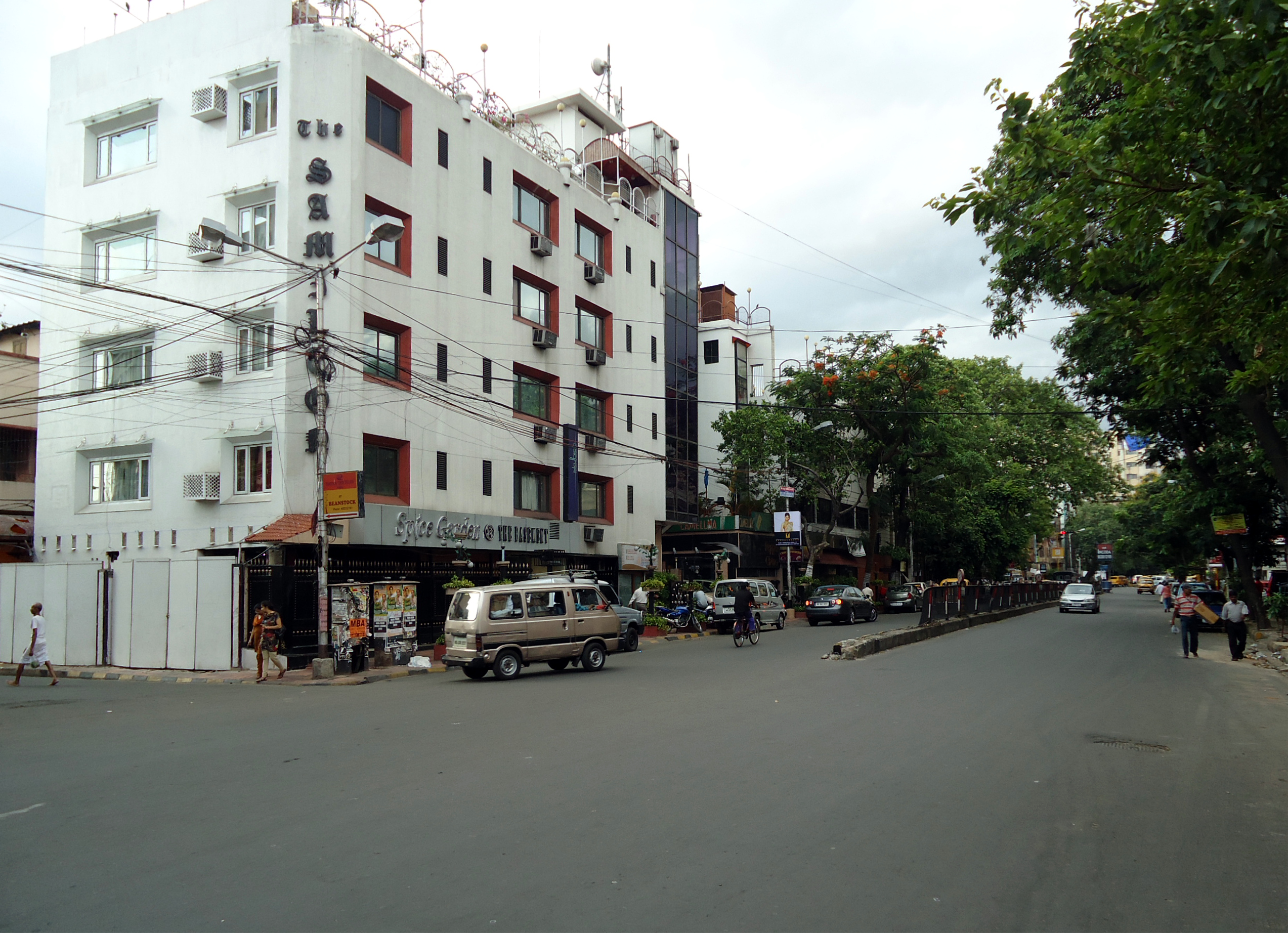
The Samilton Hotel

- Lansdowne Towers
- Ishwar Gopal Jew Trust Building
- Central Plaza
- Amar Deep Building
- Lansdowne Court
- Vasundhara Building
- Lansdowne Manor
- Basudhara
- Hindustan Club
- Ideal Plaza
- Great Eastern Technocity
- Diocesan High School
- Rameswara Building
- Hotel Pan Asia Continental
- Laxmi Narayan Temple
- The Samilton Hotel
- Padmapukur Swimming club
- Automobile Association of Eastern India
- Lansdowne Market
- PS Residency
- South Calcutta Girls College
- Ramakrishna Mission Seva Pratishthan
- Deshapriya Park
- Hartley's High School
- National High School
- Rabindra Sarobar Stadium (Lake Stadium)

== Restaurants and fast foods ==
- The Great Booze Story
- OZI
- The French Loaf
- The Sheriff
- Piccadilly Square
- Tangra Kaizen
- The Basement lounge
- Spice Garden
- Pepper Chino
- Cafe Coffee Day
- Khwab
- Tamarind
- Kurry Klub
- Marco Polo
- Barista
- The Wall
- Xrong Place
- Mandarin: 2466 2276
- Aoi
- Zeeshan
- Jai Hind Dhaba
- The Dugout
- The Pirate's Deck
- The Little Donkey
- The Corner Courtyard
- The Tea Trove
- Ice-o-metry
- Nu Variety
- Nepal Sweets
- Annapurna
- Flavours
