= KKQ =

KKQ or kkq may refer to:

- KKQ, the Indian Railways station code for Kalaikunda railway station, West Bengal, India
- kkq, the ISO 639-3 code for Kaiku language, Democratic Republic of the Congo
