= Deshapriya Park =

Park in Kolkata, India

Deshapriyo Park
- Interactive map of Deshapriyo Park
- Location: Rashbehari Avenue, Kolkata
- Coordinates: 22°31′05.85″N 88°21′13.149″E
- Owner: Public

Deshapriyo Park is a playground of South Kolkata, having Rashbehari Avenue on one side and Sarat Bose Road on another side. Different games like Cricket, Football, Tennis etc. are regularly played here by professional and amateur players and locals. In the playground one of the biggest Durga Puja is organized. The Priya cinema is located beside this playground.

As of June 2012 the park was shrinking day by day. Firstly it was encroached by a club and then a public toilet and a restaurant. Bonani Kakkar, a green activist reacted– "Deshapriyo Park has been grabbed several times in the past. The forms of permanent constructions vary, but encroachment never stops. Now fresh encroachment is allowed in the form of a stage". The stage and sculpture was however inaugurated by the chief minister of West Bengal, Mamata Banerjee on the event of Language Day. On Feb.12, 2015 Mayor Sovan Chatterjee inaugurated Kolkata's first Grid Connected battery-less Solar Power street lighting system at Deshapriya Park.

== See also ==
- Lal Dighi
- Rabindra Sarobar
- Maidan
