= Rashbehari Avenue =

Road in Kolkata, India

- Ballygunge Avenue
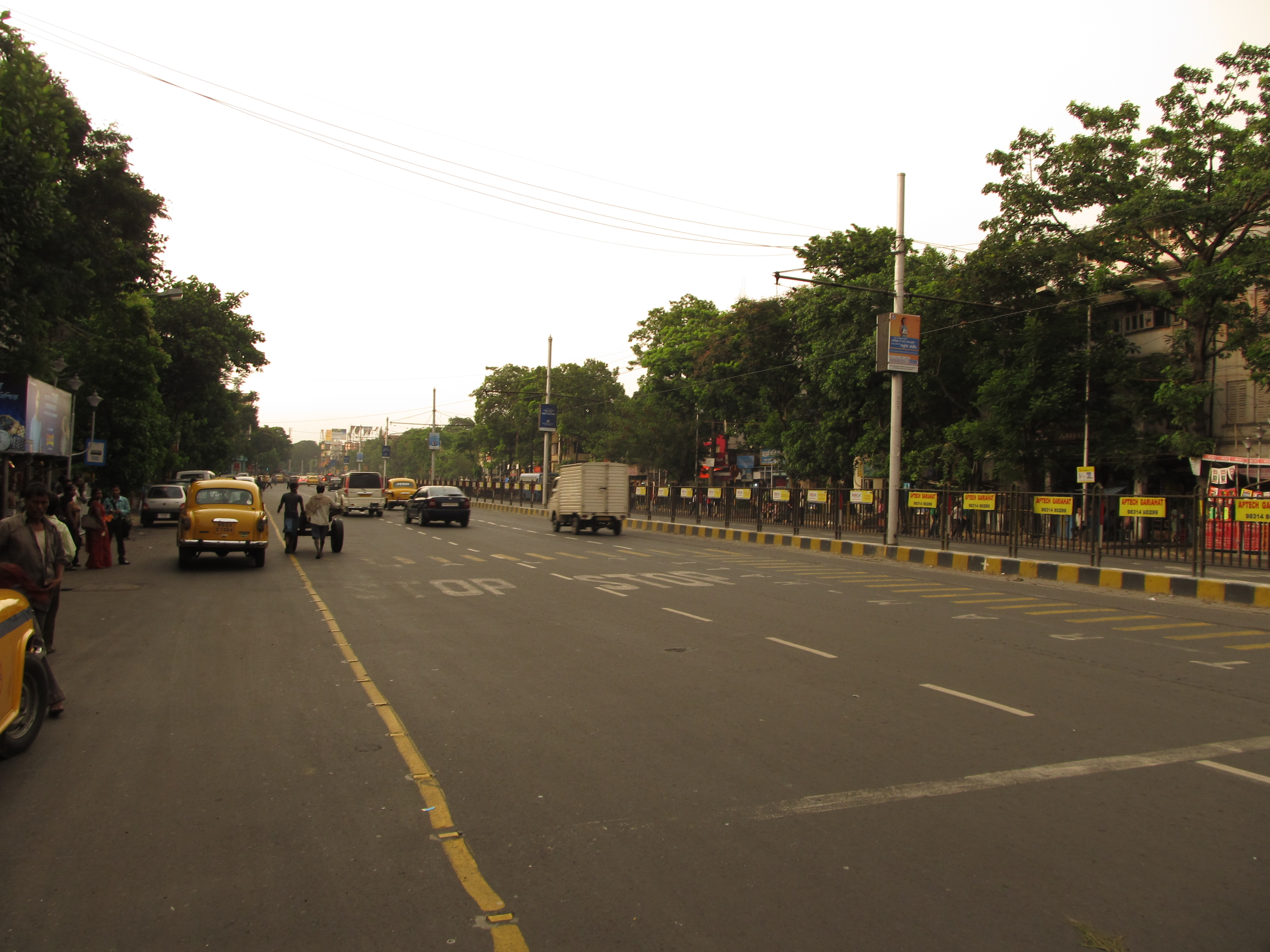
- Former name: Main Sewer Road
- Maintained by: Kolkata Municipal Corporation
- Location: Kolkata, India
- Nearest Kolkata Metro station: Kalighat; Hemanta Mukherjee
- West end: Chetla
- East end: Gariahat, with an extension to Ruby

Rashbehari Avenue (known as Main Sewer Road or Ballygunge Avenue till 1929) is one of the most prestigious and important east–west avenues of Kolkata, India. A major portion of this road is often commonly referred to as Gariahat, the prime shopping and aristocratic residential neighbourhood of South Kolkata. Rashbehari Avenue falls in the posh residential neighbourhood of Ballygunge. The road is named after Sir Rash Behari Ghosh who was an Indian politician, lawyer, social worker and philanthropist.

== Localities ==
The Gariahat Market is located on Rashbehari Avenue and Gariahat Road Crossing (Gariahat More). It is best known for its fish offerings. The other three points of the crossing contains a collection of Indian sarees and other items such as readymade garments, electronic gadgets. Besides regular shops, there are makeshift shops that crowd the sidewalks.

The main shopping area runs down to its intersection with Sarat Bose Road (Deshapriya Park) but mainly up to Triangular Park. Then it travels further west to meet Shyama Prasad Mukherjee Road (previously Russa Road) at Rashbehari Crossing (Rashbehari More) and heads towards Chetla. From Chetla-Sahanagar Bridge (Shaheed Jatin Das Setu), Rashbehari Avenue becomes Chetla Central Road and moves towards Alipore.

In the east, it meets the Eastern Metropolitan Bypass at Gold Park (Ruby Hospital). This extended part of it starts from the eastern flank of Bijon Setu (Rail Overbridge). The extended part (including Bijon Setu above suburban railways at Ballygunge railway station) till Ruby doesn't bear its original name, but is commonly called the Rashbehari Avenue Connector.

The important traffic intersections from east to west are near Ekdalia (Ballygunge Station stop), Gariahat, Hindustan Park (Ballygunge area), Deshapriya Park (Sarat Bose Road), Lake Market and Rash Behari (Shyama Prasad Mukherjee Road).

The important roads that run immediately parallel to it are Southern Avenue to its south and Hazra Road (now renamed) to its north.

== Landmarks ==
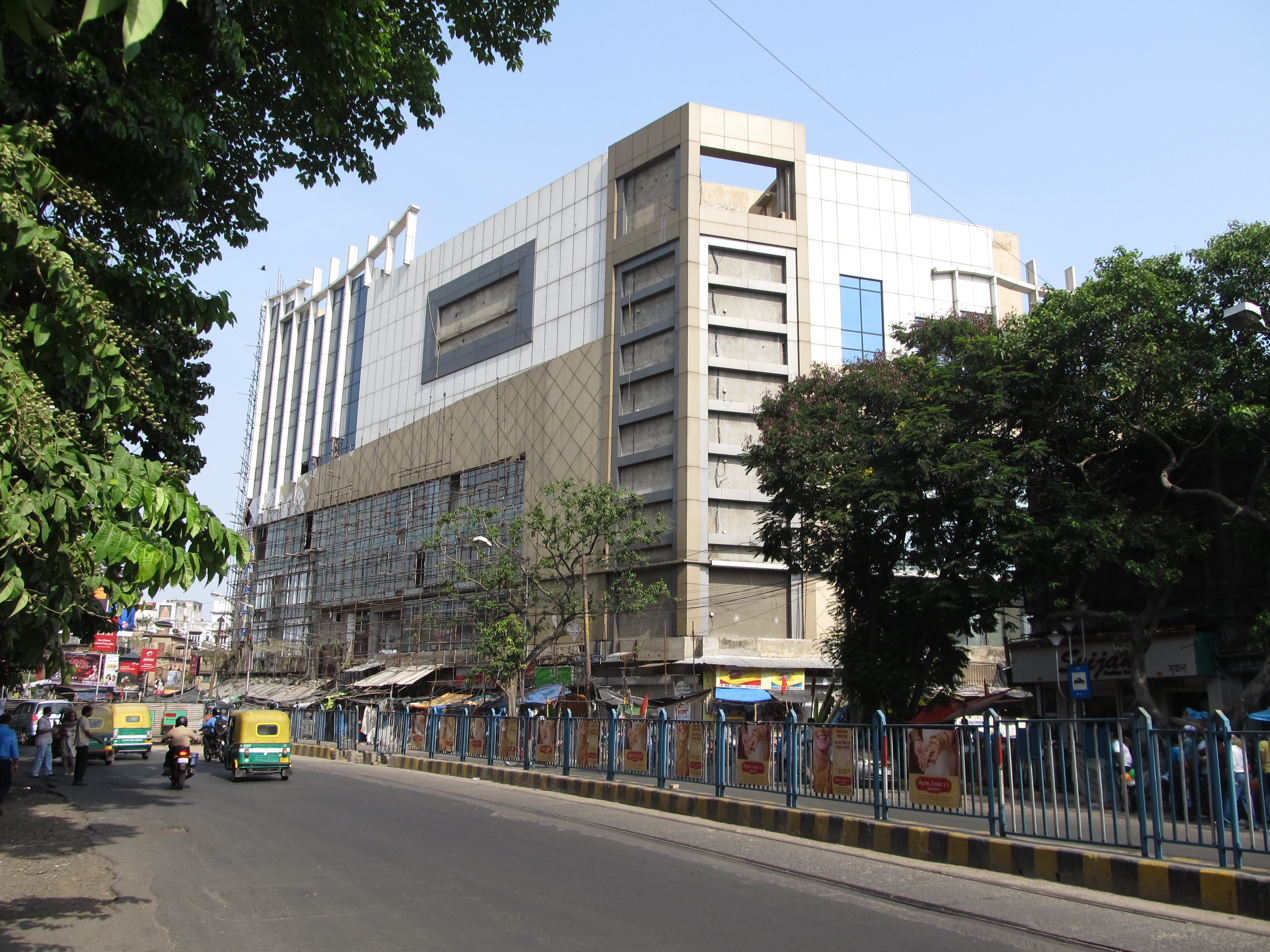
Lake Mall on Rashbehari Avenue

- Lake Mall
- Gariahat Market
- Deshapriya Park
- Priya Cinema
- Triangular Park

== Transport ==
A large number of buses ply along Rashbehari Avenue.

WBTC Bus

- S-10A (Ballygunge - Howrah Stn)
- S-9A (Ballygunge - Dunlop)
- AC-1 (Jadavpur 8B - Howrah Stn)
- AC-6 (Garia - Howrah Stn)
- AC-24 (Patuli - Howrah Stn)
- AC-24A (Kamalgazi - Howrah Stn)
- AC-5 (Garia - Howrah Stn)
- AC-47 (Kudghat - Shapoorji)
- AC-4B (Joka - Newtown)
- AC-49 (Parnasree - Ecospace)
- C-8 (Joka - Barasat)
- E-1 (Jadavpur 8B - Howrah Stn)
- EB-3 (Tollygunge Tram Depot - Ecospace)
- M-14 (Behala 14 no. Bus stand - New Town)
- S-3W (Joka - Ecospace)
- S-2 (Kudghat - Howrah Stn)
- S-4C (Haridevpur - Howrah Stn)
- S-4 (Parnasree - Karunamoyee)
- S-5 (Garia - Howrah Stn)
- S-7 (Garia - Howrah Stn)
- S-22 (Shakuntala Park - Karunamoyee)
- S-46 (Rabindra Nagar - Karunamoyee)
- V-1 (Tollygunge Tram Depot - Airport)
- S-17A (Dakshineswar - Kudghat)
- S-62 (Ramnagar - Patuli)

== See also ==
- Rashbehari (Vidhan Sabha constituency)
