= Kalighat =

- Neighbourhood in Kolkata (Calcutta)
- Location in Kolkata
- Coordinates: 22.518°N 88.346°E
- Country: India
- State: West Bengal
- City: Kolkata
- District: Kolkata
- Metro station: Jatin Das Park and Kalighat
- Municipal Corporation: Kolkata Municipal Corporation
- KMC wards: 73, 83, 84, 88

Area
  - Total: 1.07 sq mi (2.77 km^{2})
- Elevation: 36 ft (11 m)

Population (2020)
  - Total: 159,407
  - Density: 149,000/sq mi (57,400/km^{2})
- Time zone: UTC+5:30 (IST)
- PIN: 700026
- Area code: +91 33
- Lok Sabha constituency: Kolkata Dakshin
- Vidhan Sabha constituency: Bhabanipur, Rashbehari

Kalighat is a locality of South Kolkata, in Kolkata district, West Bengal, India. One of the oldest neighbourhoods in South Kolkata, Kalighat is also densely populated with a history of cultural intermingling with the various foreign incursions into the area over time.

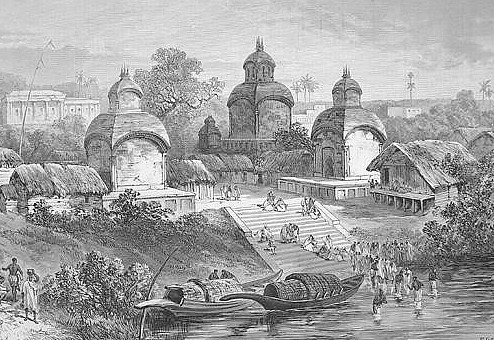
Kalighat Kali Temple, c. 1887

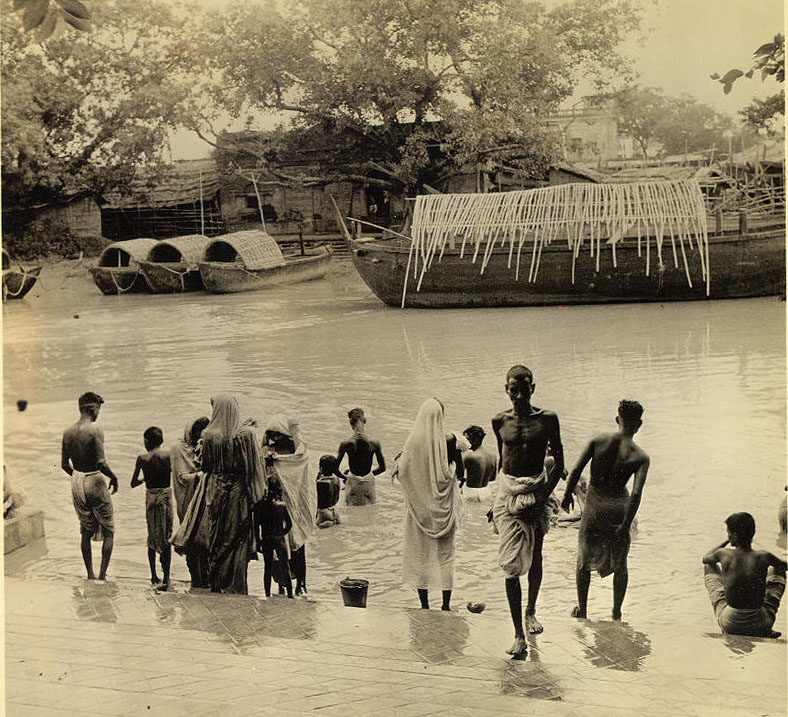
Pilgrims bathing in the Hoogly at Kalighat, c. 1947

== Kalika Temple ==
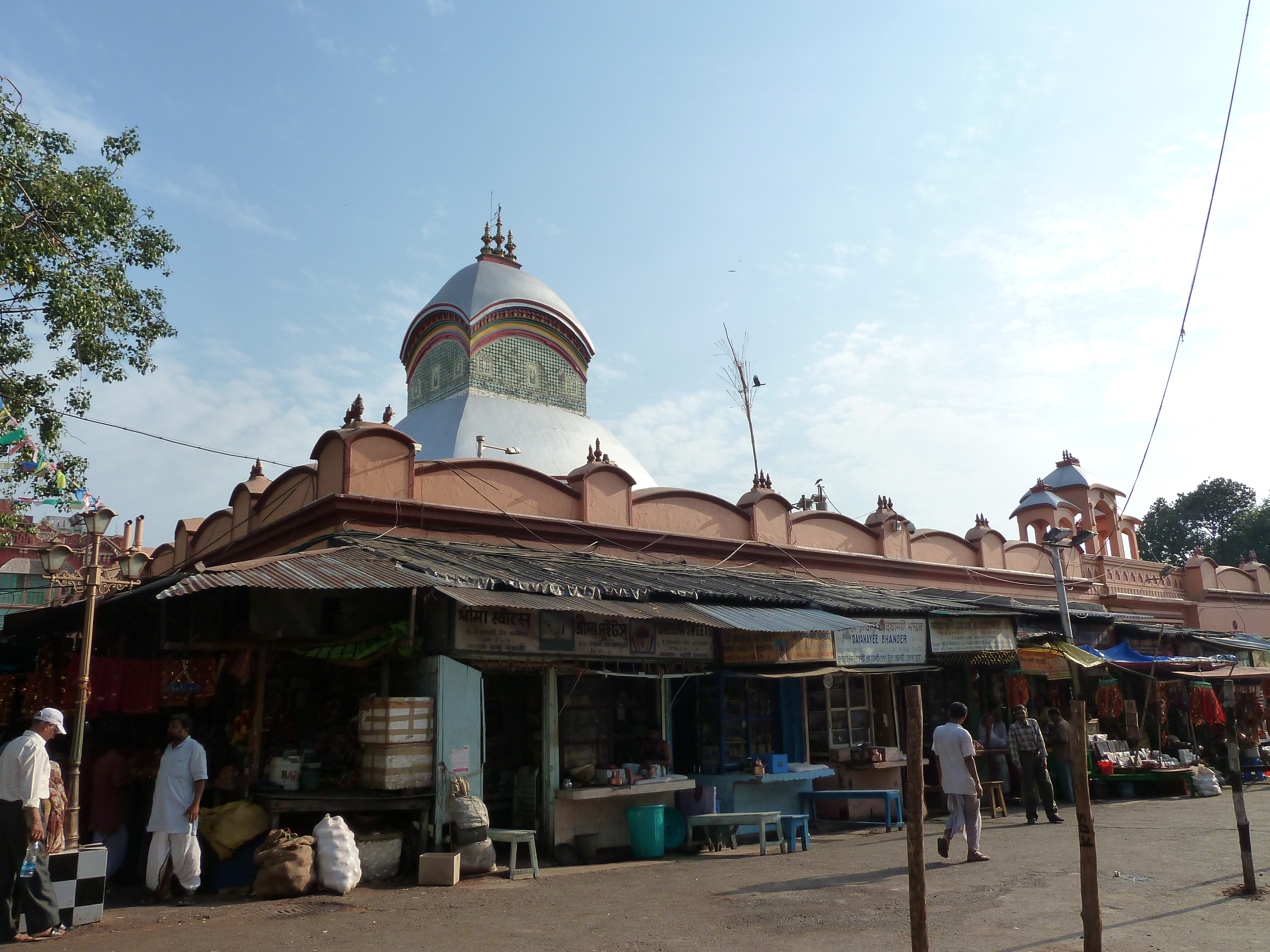
The Kalighat Temple complex

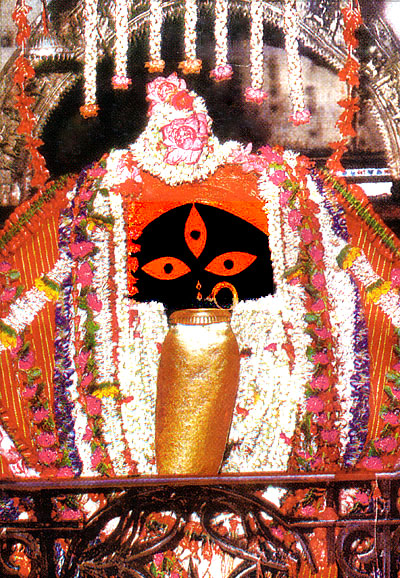
Kali idol at the Kalighat Kali Temple

Kalighat temple has references in 15th century texts. The original temple was a small hut. The present temple was built by the Sabarna Roy Choudhury family of Barisha in 1809. They offered 595 bighas of land to the Temple deity so that worship and service could be continued smoothly. It is believed by some scholars that the name Calcutta was derived from Kalighat. Historically, traders halted at Kalighat to pay patronage to the goddess. The temple was initially on the banks of Hooghly. The river over a period of time has moved away from the temple. The temple is now on the banks of a small canal called Adi Ganga, connecting to Hooghly. The present Dakshina Kali idol of touchstone was created in 1570 CE by two saints - Brahmananda Giri and Atmaram Giri based on the idol of Mata Bhuvaneshwari, the Kuladevi of Sabarna Roy Choudhury family. It was Padmabati Devi, the mother of Laksmikanta Roy Choudhury who discovered the fossils of Sati's finger in a lake called Kalikunda. This made Kalighat as one of the 51 Shakta pithas.

== Shyam Rai Temple ==
In 1843, Babu Uday Narayan Mondal, a scion of the Bawali Raj family, commissioned the Shyam Rai Temple, in the Kalighat Temple complex itself. It stands as the sole Vaishnavite temple dedicated to Radha Krishna in Kalighat. Later, Madan Koley of Saha Nagar, and a distant relative of the family later constructed the Dol Mancha of the Temple in 1858.

== Panchannagram and Kali-Kshetra ==
The East India Company obtained from the Mughal emperor Farrukhsiyar, in 1717, the right to rent from 38 villages surrounding their settlement. Of these 5 lay across the Hooghly in what is now Howrah district. The remaining 33 villages were on the Calcutta side. After the fall of Siraj-ud-daulah, the last independent Nawab of Bengal, it purchased these villages in 1758 from Mir Jafar, and reorganised them. These villages were known en-bloc as Dihi Panchannagram and Kalighat was one of them. It was considered to be a suburb beyond the limits of the Maratha Ditch. Kalighat was originally called Kali-Kshetra, which is widely accepted as the origin for the word Kalikata, and in turn Calcutta or Kolkata.

== The Kalighat hoard ==
Some time in 1783, a fisherman found a treasure hoard of more than 200 gold coins somewhere near the now-defunct Strand on the Adi Ganga, near Kalighat. Not knowing what to do with it, he sold it off to Raja Nabakrishna Deb, Zamindar of Shobhabazar. Seeing the coins as an opportunity for gaining confidence with the then Governor General of India, Warren Hastings, Nabakrishna Deb gave him the coins. Keeping a few with him, Warren Hastings sent 172 coins from the horde to London, to the East India Company. These coins belonged to the Gupta kings, but as no one knew of the Guptas back then (It would not be before another half a century or so that Alexander Cunningham would find out about the era of the Guptas), these coins held little value to the people involved.

However, for all practical purposes, the hoard was thought to be lost, as the Company directors sent most of the coins to the melting pot, and some to a few collectors. When Hastings returned to London, he found only 24 of them in the collection of the British Museum. This astonished him beyond measures. He thought he had made a magnificent contribution to the Court of Directors — a hoard of Persian Darics (since no one knew of the Guptas back then).

In 1825, Marsden prepared the Nusmiamata Orientalia, where for the first time they were mentioned as Gupta coins. The coins had been placed in a brass pot that remained submerged in water for a long time, hence the coins developed an underwater patina of clayish black, owing to the reaction of the gold and the alloys in the coin with the alluvium.

The hoard contained the Archer Type coins from the reign of Chandragupta II, who had probably annexed Bengal, and Kumaragupta I with an abundance in coins from the reign of Vishnugupta and Narasimhagupta, besides a few from the times of Shashanka, a later ruler of Gauda. This is the largest hoard of Gupta coins ever found in the history of India.

== The Kalighat Temple as a Shakti pitha ==
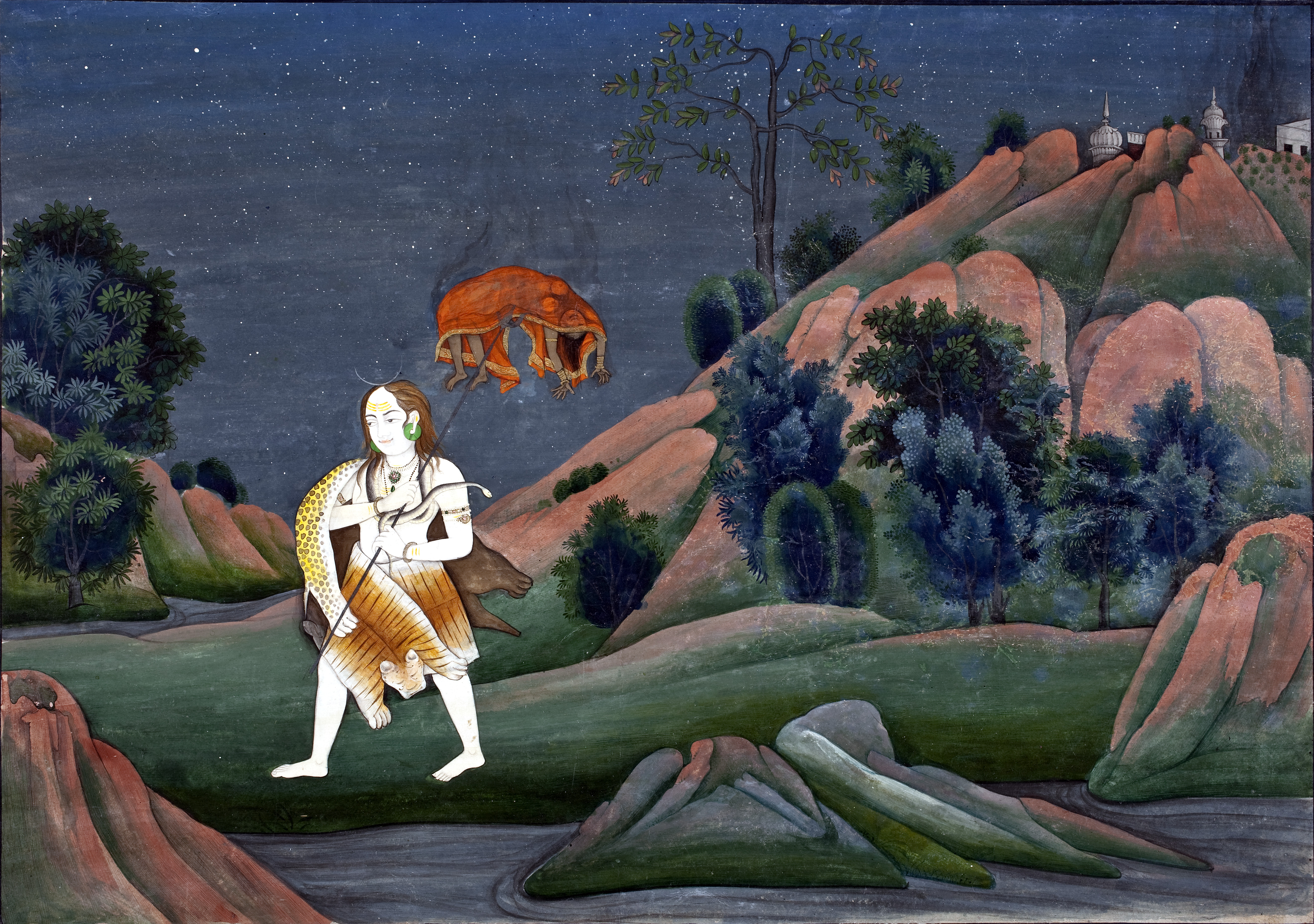
Shiva carrying the corpse of Sati Devi

The Temple at Kalighat is revered as an important Shakta pitha, by the Shaktism sect of Hinduism. The mythology of Daksha yajna and Sati's self immolation is the story behind the origin of Shakti Peethas.

== Kalighat painting ==
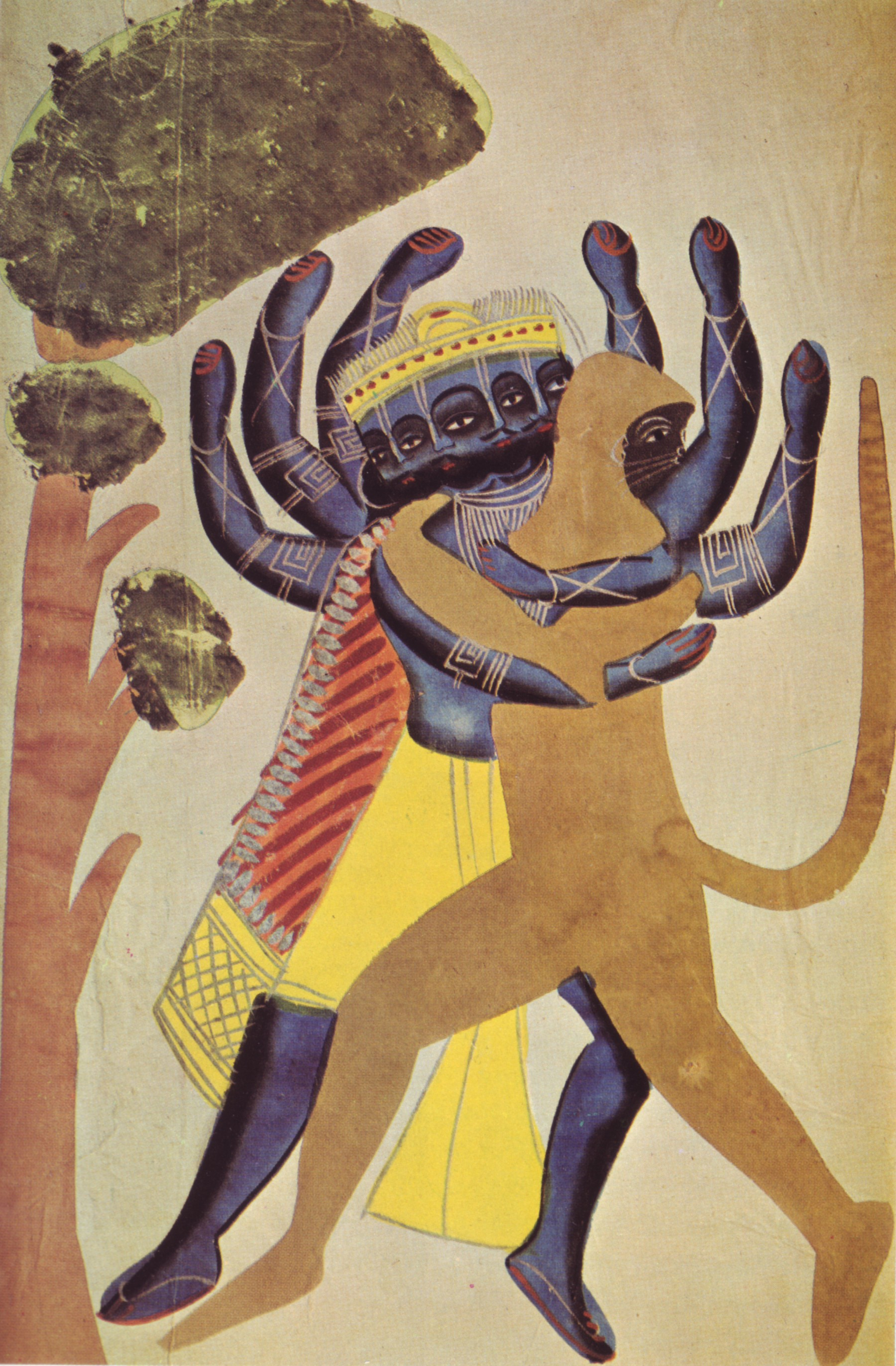
Ravana and Hanuman, Kalighat school of painting, c1880

Kalighat painting, or pata (originally pronounced 'pot' in Bengali) is a style of Indian painting derives its name from the place. It is characterised by generously curving figures of both men and women and an earthy satirical style. It developed during the nineteenth century in response to the sudden prosperity brought to Calcutta by the East India Company trade, whereby many houses including that of 'Prince' Dwarkanath Tagore, grandfather of Rabindranath Tagore became incredibly wealthy. Many of these nouveau riche families came from not particular exalted caste backgrounds, so the orthodox tended to frown on them and their often very tasteless conspicuous consumption. To the common people the babus, as they were called, were equally objects of fun and sources of income. Thus the 'babu culture' portrayed in the Kalighat patas often shows inversions of the social order (wives beating husbands or leading them about in the guise of pet goats or dogs, maidservants wearing shoes, sahibs in undignified postures, domestic contretemps, and the like.) They also showed European innovations (babus wearing European clothes, smoking pipes, reading at desks, etc.). The object of this is only partly satirical; it also expresses the wonder that ordinary Bengalis felt on exposure to these new and curious ways and objects.

Kalighat pata pictures are highly stylised, do not use perspective, are usually pen and ink line drawings filled in with flat bright colours and normally use paper as a substrate, though some may be found with cloth backing or on cloth. The artists were rarely educated, and usually came from a lineage of artisans. Kalighat patas are still made today although genuine work is hard to come by. The art form is urban and largely secular: although gods and goddesses are often depicted, they appear in much the same de-romanticised way as the humans do. By contrast, the Orissa tradition of pata-painting, centering on Puri, is consciously devotional. Kalighat pata has been credited with influencing the Bengal School of art associated with Jamini Roy.

== Kalighat in fiction ==
Amitav Ghosh's The Calcutta Chromosome is partly set in Kalighat and gives a wonderfully atmospheric depiction of the region as well as the city itself.

Kalighat also plays a prominent role in Song of Kali by Dan Simmons and in the short story "Calcutta, Lord of Nerves" by Poppy Z. Brite. It also features in the movie Kahaani starring Vidya Balan and directed by Sujoy Ghosh.

In Chapter 6 of Neil Gaiman's 2001 contemporary fantasy American Gods, Kalighat is directly referenced by the eponymous deity:

“So I am a child, am I?” She wagged a finger at him. “I was old in Kalighat before you were dreamed of, you foolish man. I am a child? Then I am a child, for there is nothing in your foolish talk to see.” Again, a moment of double-vision: Shadow saw the old woman, her dark face pinched with age and disapproval, but behind her he saw something huge, a naked woman with skin as black as a new leather jacket, and lips and tongue the bright red of arterial blood. Around her neck were skulls, and her many hands held knives, and swords, and severed heads.

== Police district ==
Kalighat police station is part of the South division of Kolkata Police. Located at 51, Mahim Halder Street, Kolkata-700026, it has jurisdiction over the police district which is bordered on the north from the north-east corner of the junction of Sambhu Nath Pandit Street and D. L. Khan Road (old Bhowanipore Road), then eastward by the northern limits of Sambhu Nath Pandit Street to Harish Mukherjee Road, the crossing Harish Mukherjee Road, up to the north-east corner of the junction of Sambhu Nath Pandit Street and Harish Mukherjee Road.

On the east, from the north-east corner of the junction of Sambhu Nath Pandit Street and Harish Mukherjee Road, then southward by the eastern limits of Harish Mukherjee Road to Hazra Road, then eastward along the northern limits of Hazra Road, then crossing Shyama Prasad Mukherjee Road up to the north-east corner of the junction of Hazra Road and Shyama Prasad Mukherjee Road and then southward along the eastern limits of Shyama Prasad Mukherjee Road up to the north-east corner of the junction of R. B. Avenue and Shyama Prasad Mukherjee Road.

On the south, from the north-east corner of the junction of Rashbehari Avenue and Shyama Prasad Mukherjee Road (old Russa Road), then crossing Shyama Prasad Mukherjee Road, then west ward by the northern limits of Rashbehari Avenue up to the north-east corner of the junction of Rashbehari Avenue and Tolly's Nullah.

On the west, from the north-east corner of the junction of Rashbehari Avenue and Tolly's Nullah, then northwards by the eastern bank of Tolly's Nullah to Rashbehari Avenue, then crossing Rashbehari Avenue, northward along the eastern bank of Tolly's Nullah to the crossing of Tolly's Nullah and D. L. Khan Road (old Bhowanipore Road) and then by the eastern limits of D.L. Khan Road up to the north-east corner of the junction of Sambhu Nath Pandit Street and D. L. Khan Road.

Tollygunge Women's police station has jurisdiction over all the police districts in the South Division, i.e. Park Street, Shakespeare Sarani, Alipore, Hastings, Maidan, Bhowanipore, Kalighat, Tollygunge, Charu Market, New Alipur and Chetla.

== Red-light district ==
Located around the banks of the Adi Ganga canal, an estimated 1,000 to 1,500 prostitutes live and work in the red-light district. Kolkata has emerged as a hub for the trafficking of girls, who often arrive from Nepal and Burma. From Kolkata they are often sold again to brothels in Mumbai (Bombay). Some will go on to the Middle East, Africa and Europe.

== See also ==
- Kalighat Falta Railway
- Kalighat Home for the Dying
- Kalighat Painting
