= Alipore =

- Neighbourhood in Kolkata (Calcutta)
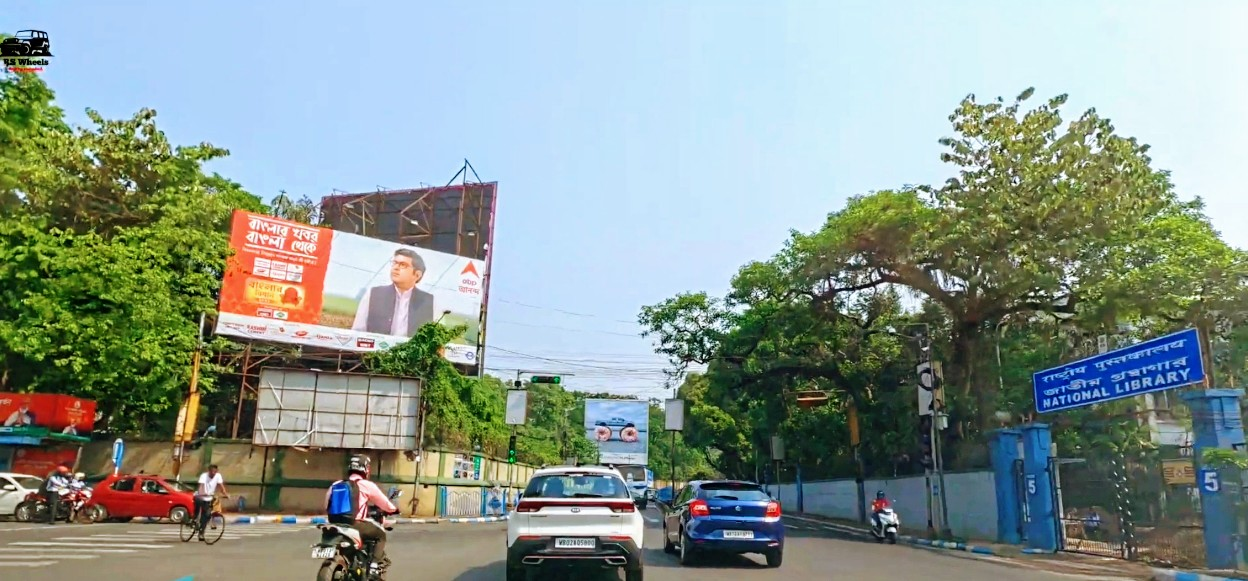
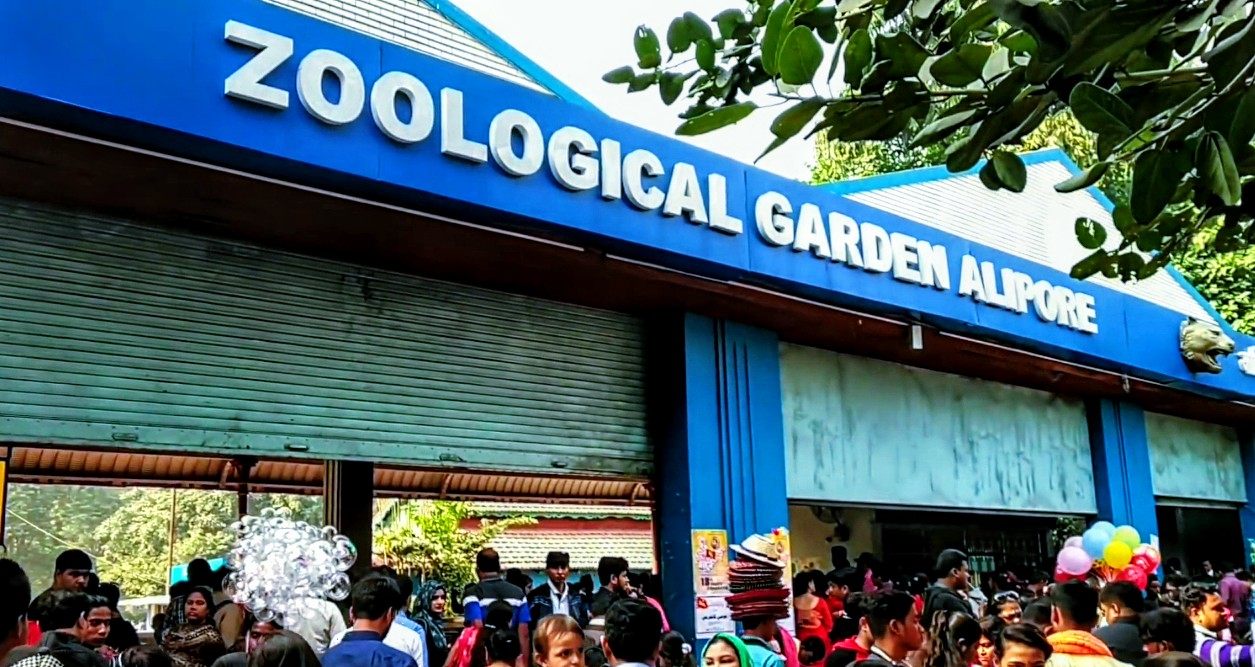
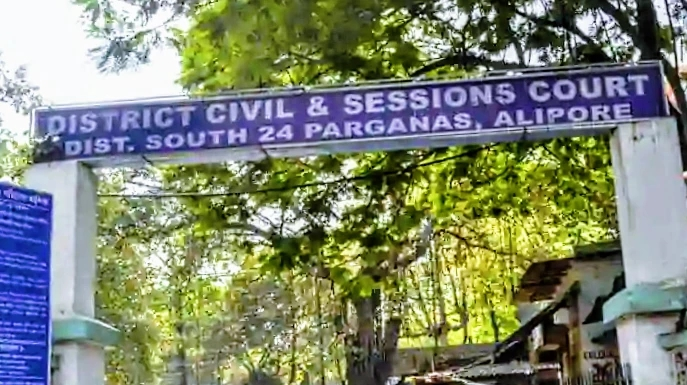
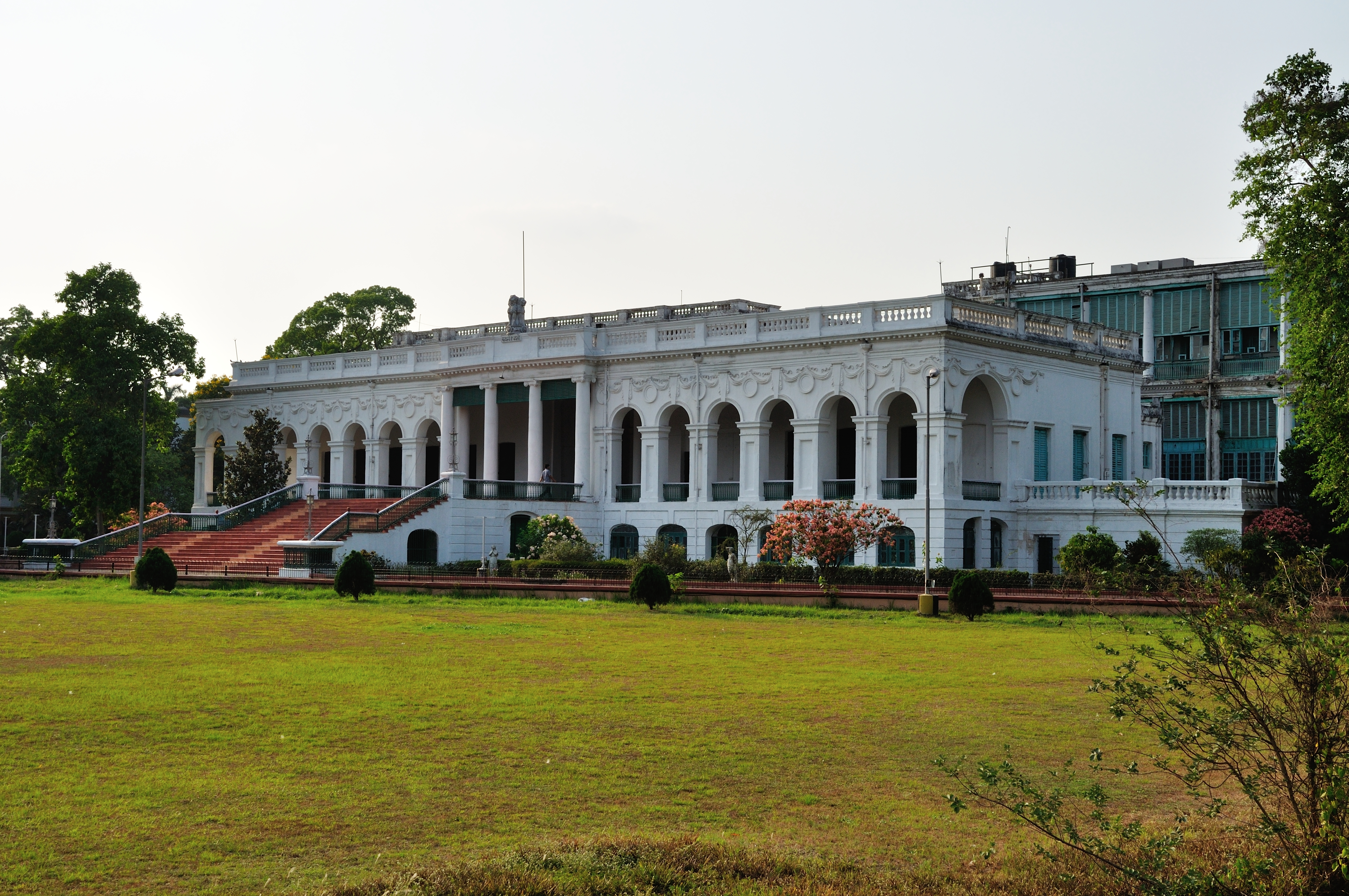
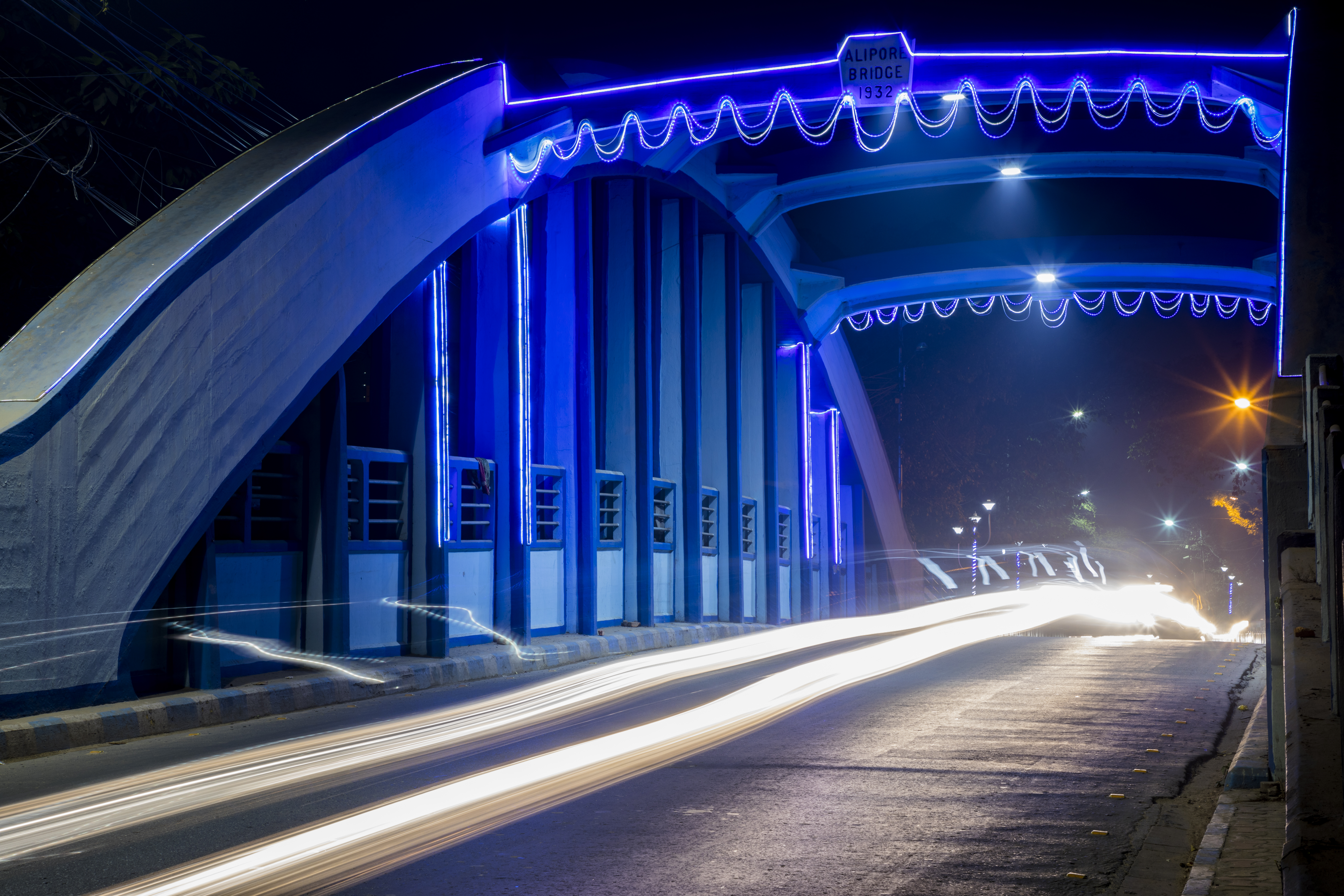
- Clockwise from top: Alipore Road Near National Library, Alipore District Court (South 24 Parganas), Alipore Bridge, Indian National Library, Alipore Zoological Garden.

- Location in Kolkata
- Coordinates: 22°31′31.071″N 88°19′51.947″E
- Country: India
- State: West Bengal
- District: South 24 Parganas
- City: Kolkata
- Metro Station: Jatin Das Park, Kalighat, Majerhat and Kidderpore(under construction)
- Municipal Corporation: Kolkata Municipal Corporation
- KMC ward: 74, 82
- Elevation: 14 m (46 ft)

Population
  - Total: For population see linked KMC ward page

Languages
  - Official: Bengali, English
- Time zone: UTC+5:30 (IST)
- PIN: 700022, 700023, 700027
- Lok Sabha constituency: Kolkata Dakshin
- Vidhan Sabha constituency: Kolkata Port and Bhabanipur

Alipore is a neighbourhood of South Kolkata in Kolkata district in the Indian state of West Bengal.

It is flanked by the Tolly Nullah to the north, Bhowanipore to the east, the Diamond Harbour Road to the west and New Alipore to the south, bordered by the Budge Budge section of the Sealdah South section railway line.

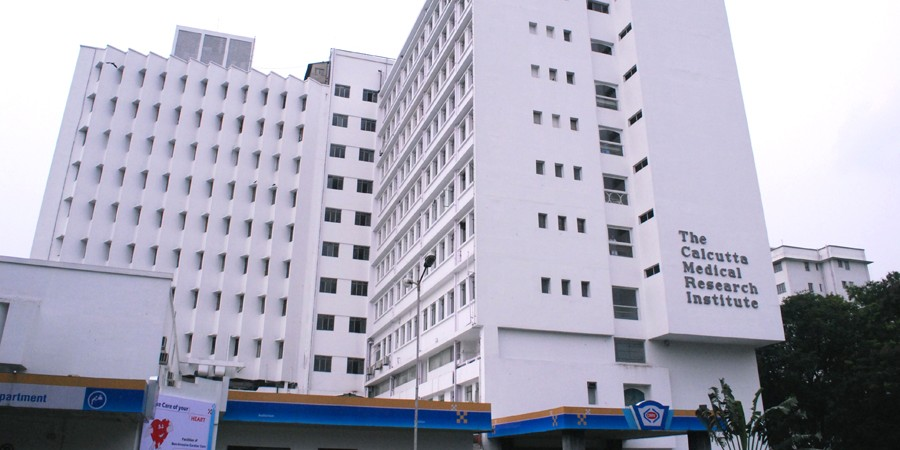
The Calcutta Medical Research Institute (CMRI)

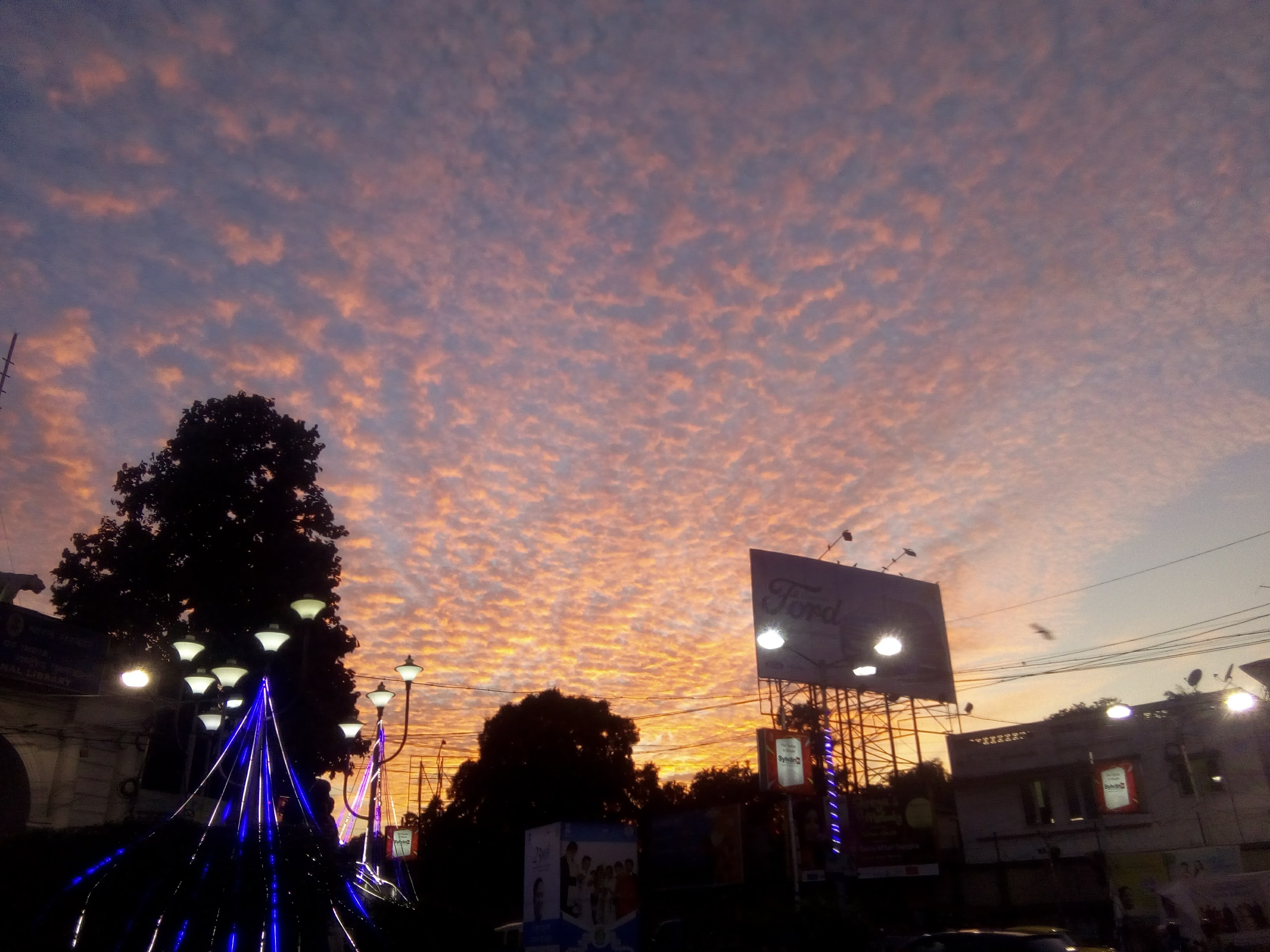
Purple tone from the evening sky in Alipore

== Geography ==
=== Location ===
Alipore is located at 22.5391712°N 88.3272782°E. It has an average elevation of 14 metres (46 feet). Alipore area is bordered by the following roads - AJC Bose Road to the north, D L Khan Road to the East, Diamond Harbour Road to the West and Alipore Avenue to the south.

=== Police district ===
Alipore police station is part of the South division of Kolkata Police. It is located at 8, Belvadere Road, Kolkata-700027.

Tollygunge Women's police station has jurisdiction over all the police districts in the South Division, i.e. Park Street, Shakespeare Sarani, Alipore, Hastings, Maidan, Bhowanipore, Kalighat, Tollygunge, Charu Market, New Alipur and Chetla.

== Transport ==
Alipore is connected to all parts of the city by extensive bus services. Alipore is served by the Majherhat and Kidderpore railway stations on the Circular section of Kolkata Suburban Railway.

The Kalighat metro station of the Kolkata Metro as well as the Jatin Das Park station is close to Alipore.

== See also ==
- Alipore (Vidhan Sabha constituency)
- Dhanadhanya Auditorium
- New Alipore
- Zoological Garden, Alipore
