= Blue Line (Kolkata Metro) =

Transit line of rapid transport in Kolkata, India

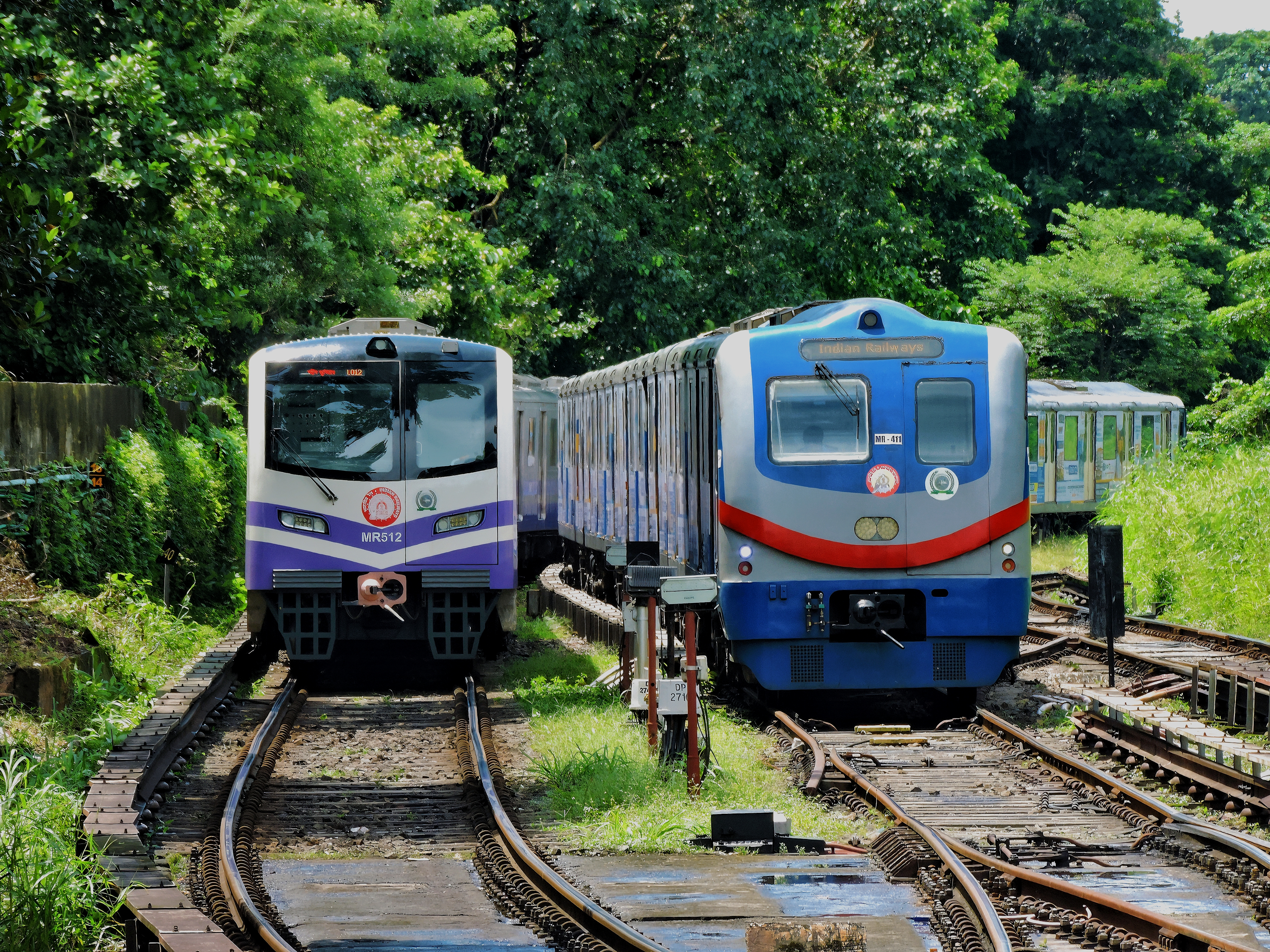
- A CRRC Dalian rake (left) going towards Shahid Khudiram & ICF Medha (right) standing at reversal point at Mahanayak Uttam Kumar

Overview
- Status: Operational
- Owner: Indian Railways
- Locale: Kolkata metropolitan region
- Termini: Dakshineswar (North); Kavi Subhash (South)
- Connecting lines: Green Line; Yellow Line; Future: Purple Line; Pink Line; Orange Line
- Stations: 26
- Website: Indian Railways

Service
- Type: Rapid transit
- System: Kolkata Metro
- Operator: Metro Railway, Kolkata
- Depots: Noapara; Tollygunge; New Garia
- Rolling stock: ICF BHEL; ICF MEDHA; CRRC Dalian
- Daily ridership: 600,000–650,000 (Weekdays); 380,000 (Weekends)
- Ridership: 18.93 crore(2024-2025)

History
- Opened: 24 October 1984; 41 years ago
- Last extension: 22 February 2021; 5 years ago

Technical
- Line length: 32.13 km (19.96 mi)
- Number of tracks: 2
- Character: underground, at-grade and elevated
- Track gauge: 5 ft 6 in (1,676 mm) broad gauge
- Electrification: 750 V DC third rail
- Operating speed: 65 km/h (40 mph) (in service)
- Signalling: TPWS signalling
Route Map

The Blue Line (Line 1), also known as North–South Metro, is a rapid transit metro line of the Kolkata Metro in Kolkata, West Bengal, India. It consists of 26 operational stations from Dakshineswar to Kavi Subhash, out of which 9 of the stations are elevated, 2 are at-grade and the remaining 15 are underground. With a total distance of 32.13 km (19.96 mi), the line connects Dakshineswar and New Garia and uses 5 ft 6 in (1,676 mm) broad gauge tracks. Presently Kavi Subhash is closed so the terminal is Shahid Khudiram. This line was the first underground railway to be built in India, with the first operations commencing in October 1984 and the full stretch that was initially planned being operational by February 1995. On 28 December 2010, Kolkata Metro became the 17th zone of the Indian Railways. Being the country's first, and a completely indigenous process, the construction of the Kolkata Metro Blue Line was more of a trial-and-error affair, in contrast to the Delhi Metro, which has seen the involvement of numerous international consultants. As a result, it took nearly 23 years to completely construct around 15 km (9.3 mi) underground railway from Birpara up to Tollygunge.

It connects Green Line at Esplanade. It connectsOrange at Kavi Subhash, as Blue Line got closed and will eventually connect Purple Line at Esplanade and Park Street, Yellow Line at Noapara and Pink Line at Baranagar.

== Future Extensions ==
Public transport experts have suggested that the line be extended from Dakshineswar to Bally (where it can connect with Howrah Division of Kolkata Suburban Railway) and eventually to Dankuni, an emerging industrial hub of Kolkata metropolitan region.

== History ==
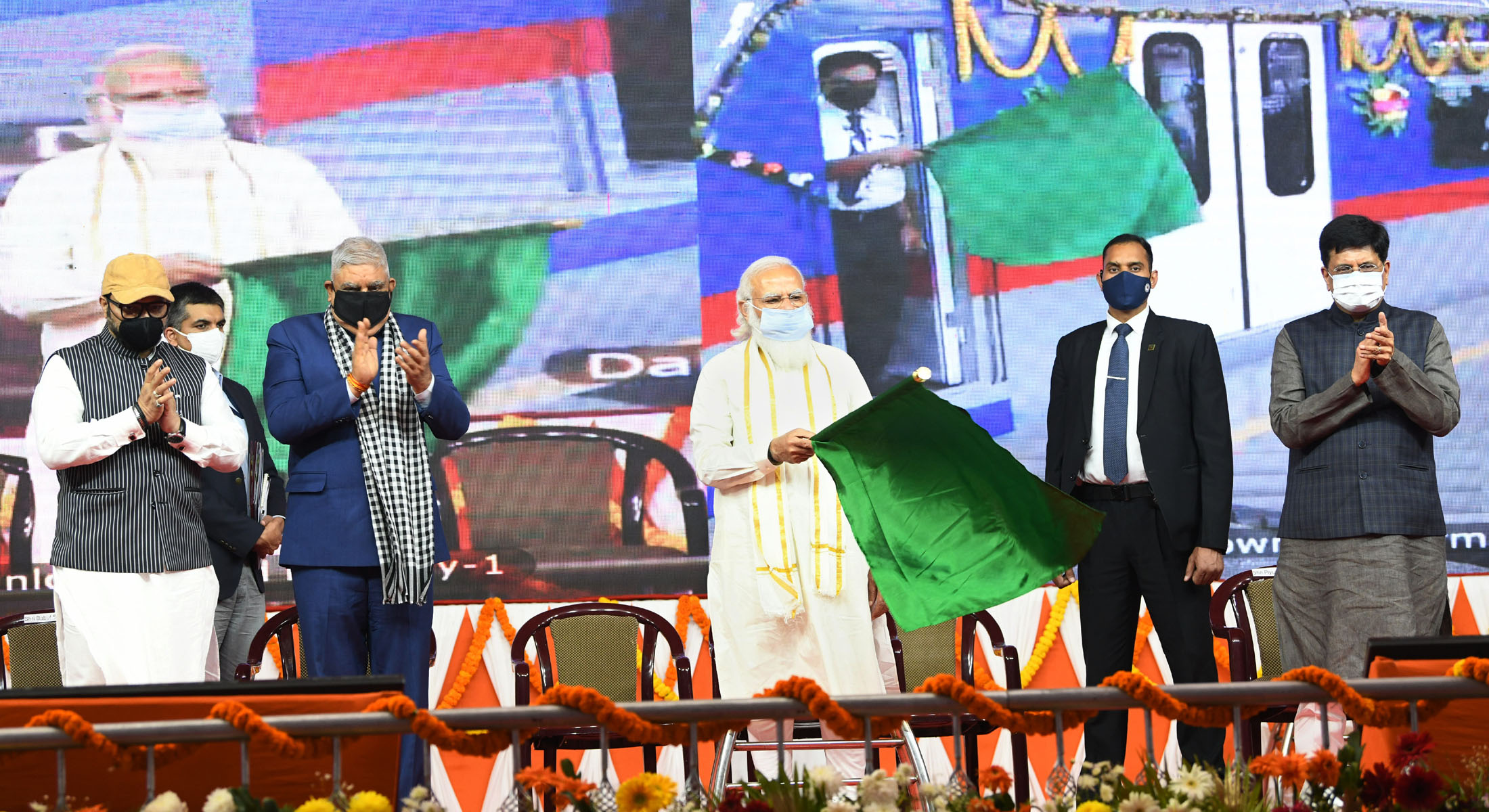
Prime Minister Narendra Modi inaugurating the Noapara-Dakshineswar stretch of Blue Line on February 22, 2021.

The laying of the founding stone was done in 1972, but actual construction of Blue Line started only in 1978. Blue Line is 31.38 km (19.50 mi) long with 26 stations (see above). Running of the first metro car on the line by 1984 was considered a great engineering challenge. Former railways minister A. B. A. Ghani Khan Chowdhury took a massive effort to perform it. The first section opened between Esplanade & Bhawanipore (now called Netaji Bhawan). First day Metro Railway Kolkata was started by Sri Tapan Kumar Nath and Sri Sanjay Sil. There were no connections of this stretch with the two depots at Dum Dum & Tollygunge (Now called Mahanayak Uttam Kumar). So metro cars had to be put down on the track near Esplanade by crane, by directly digging the road surface. Initially, only four-car trains were run until 1986. There were no magnetic gates or escalators at that time and ordinary revolving gates served as exits. The Metro too operated on only a single line. Two years later, Blue Line extended up to Tollygunge, at the southern end. At the same time, the metro service was extended to the double line. Magnetic tickets and more entry gates were also introduced at that time. The number of compartments in each train was increased to eight.

Metro service was also started from Dum Dum, at the northern end, to Belgachia in parallel with the extension of the line to the south. But this short portion was not popular and the service was closed down to be restarted when the entire stretch along the north–south corridor was completed.

After 1986 many political incidents hampered the construction, and work almost stopped for nearly six years. After restarting work, the Dum Dum to Shyambazar metro service was started in 1994. This portion was served by four-car trains. Two months later, the Esplanade – Chandni Chowk section was opened and Chandni Chowk – Central section opened three months later. The service from Dum Dum to Tollygunge started in 1995, with Mahatma Gandhi Road metro station, opening in 1996. During this time, more magnetic gates and escalators were added and the revolving gates were slowly phased out.

In 2009, a large number of stations on Blue Line were renamed by then Minister of Railways Mamata Banerjee.

On 22 February 2021, the Noapara – Dakshineswar stretch was inaugurated by Prime Minister Narendra Modi.

On 21 July 2024, the entire stretch from Dakshineswar to Kavi Subhash, crossed 1.92 lakh passenger mark for the first time on a single day.

On 28 July 2025, cracks were detected in the last four columns of the Line-1 Up platform at Kavi Subhash station, the line's southern terminus. So, the Line-1 platforms of the station were closed to passengers as a safety measure and the trains are being terminated at Shahid Khudiram station. However, the empty rakes would continue to run up to the station for reversal and maintenance at its depot.On investigation, it was found that the damage on the columns supporting the platforms were weakened beyond repair. So, Metro Authorities decided to raze the entire Line-1 complex of the station (keeping the tracks intact) and rebuild it. E-tenders were floated and the work is expected to be completed within ten months.

== Timeline ==
The following dates represent the dates the section opened to the public, not the private inauguration.

History
Extension date	Terminals		Length
24 October 1984	Esplanade	Bhowanipore	3.40 kilometers (2.11 mi)
12 November 1984	Dum Dum	Belgachhia	2.15 kilometers (1.34 mi)
29 April 1986	Bhowanipur (now Netaji Bhavan)	Tollygunge (now Mahanayak Uttam Kumar)	4.24 kilometers (2.63 mi)
13 August 1994	Belgachhia	Shyambazar	1.63 kilometers (1.01 mi)
2 October 1994	Esplanade	Chandni Chowk	0.71 kilometers (0.44 mi)
19 February 1995	Shyambazar	Girish Park	1.92 kilometers (1.19 mi)
19 February 1995	Chandni Chowk	Central	0.60 kilometers (0.37 mi)
27 September 1995	Central	Girish Park	1.80 kilometers (1.12 mi)
22 August 2009	Tollygunge (Mahanayak Uttam Kumar)	Garia Bazar (now Kavi Nazrul)	5.85 kilometers (3.64 mi)
7 October 2010	Garia Bazar (now Kavi Nazrul)	New Garia (now Kavi Subhash)	3.00 kilometers (1.86 mi)
10 July 2013	Dum Dum	Noapara	2.09 kilometers (1.30 mi)
22 February 2021	Noapara	Dakshineswar	4.1 kilometers (2.5 miles)
Total	Dakshineswar	New Garia (now Kavi Subhash) (Note: The train currently terminates at Shahid Khudiram station.)	31.3 kilometers (19.4 mi)

== Stations ==
The stations of this Line are: The stations of this Line are:

Blue Line
#	Station Name		Station Code	Distance (km)	Opening	Connections	Layout	Platform Type
#	English	Bengali	Station Code	Distance (km)	Opening	Connections	Layout	Platform Type
1	Dakshineswar	দক্ষিণেশ্বর	KDSW	0	22 February 2021	Dakshineswar Ma Bhabotarini Jetty Ghat	Elevated	Side
2	Baranagar	বরাহ নগর	KBAR	1.759	22 February 2021	Pink Line (Proposed) Baranagar Road	Elevated	Side
3	Noapara	নোয়াপাড়া	KNAP	2.38	10 July 2013	Yellow Line	Elevated	Side & Island
4	Dum Dum	দমদম	KDMI	2.091	12 November 1984	Dum Dum Jn	Elevated	Side
5	Belgachia	বেলগাছিয়া	KBEL	2.151	12 November 1984		Underground	Island
6	Shyambazar	শ্যামবাজার	KSHY	1.625	15 February 1995		Underground	Island
7	Shobhabazar Sutanuti	শোভাবাজার সুতানুটি	KSHO	0.929	15 February 1995		Underground	Island
8	Girish Park	গিরিশ পার্ক	KGPK	1.001	15 February 1995		Underground	Island
9	Mahatma Gandhi Road	মহাত্মা গান্ধী রোড	KMHR	0.766	27 September 1995		Underground	Island
10	Central	সেন্ট্রাল	KCEN	1.037	15 February 1995		Underground	Island
11	Chandni Chowk	চাঁদনি চক	KCWC	0.598	15 February 1995		Underground	Island
12	Esplanade	এসপ্ল্যানেড	KESP	0.705	24 October 1984	Green Line; Purple Line (Under Construction)	Underground	Island
13	Park Street	পার্ক স্ট্রীট	KPSK	0.808	24 October 1984	Purple Line (Under Construction)	Underground	Side
14	Maidan	ময়দান	KMDI	1.536	24 October 1984		Underground	Island
15	Rabindra Sadan	রবীন্দ্র সদন	KRSD	1.015	24 October 1984		Underground	Island
16	Netaji Bhavan	নেতাজি ভবন	KNBN	0.848	24 October 1984		Underground	Island
17	Jatin Das Park	যতীন দাস পার্ক	KJPK	1.033	29 April 1986		Underground	Island
18	Kalighat	কালীঘাট	KKHG	0.621	29 April 1986		Underground	Island
19	Rabindra Sarobar	রবীন্দ্র সরোবর	KRSB	1.864	29 April 1986	Tollygunge	Underground	Island
20	Mahanayak Uttam Kumar	মহানায়ক উত্তম কুমার	KMUK	1.344	29 April 1986	Purple Line (Proposed)	At Grade	Side & Island
21	Netaji	নেতাজি	KNTJ	1.814	22 August 2009		Elevated	Side
22	Masterda Surya Sen	মাস্টারদা সূর্য সেন	KMSN	1.722	22 August 2009		Elevated	Side
23	Gitanjali	গীতাঞ্জলি	KGTN	1.053	22 August 2009		Elevated	Side
24	Kavi Nazrul	কবি নজরুল	KKNZ	1.245	22 August 2009		Elevated	Side
25	Shahid Khudiram	শহিদ ক্ষুদিরাম	KSKD	1.275	7 October 2010		Elevated	Side
26	Kavi Subhash (Under Construction; Trains terminate at Shahid Khudiram temporarily)	কবি সুভাষ	KKVS [Blue] / KKSO [Orange]	0.91	7 October 2010	Orange Line New Garia	At Grade	Side

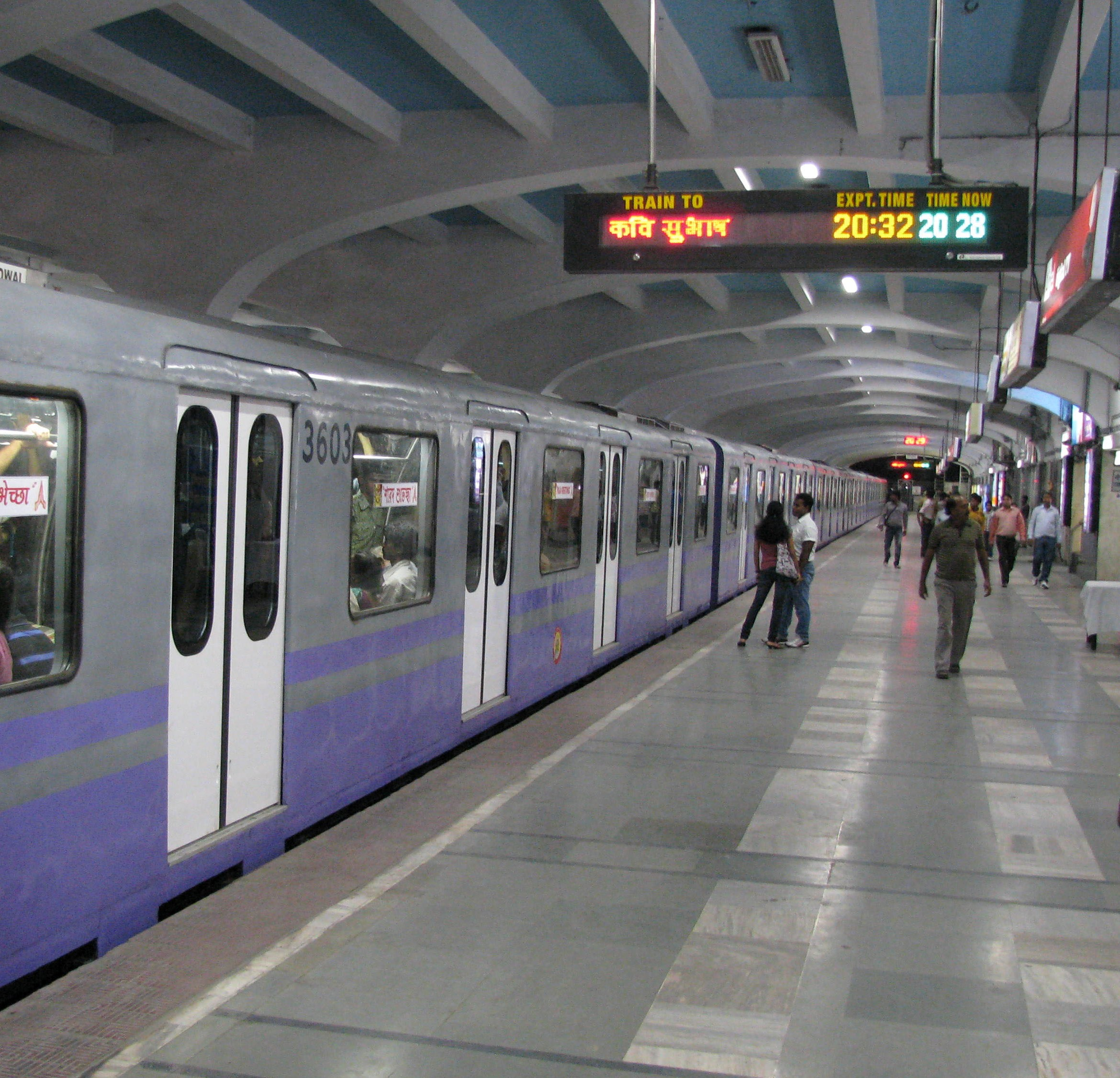
Kolkata Metro rake on the north–south line.

=== Alignment & interchanges ===
Dakshineswar, Baranagar, Dum Dum, Noapara, Park Street, Mahanayak Uttam Kumar, Netaji, Masterda Surya Sen, Gitanjali, Kavi Nazrul, Shahid Khudiram and Kavi Subhash have side platforms; all other stations have island platforms. Mahanayak Uttam Kumar is an exception as it has both platforms on the sides as well as in the centre. Dakshineswar, Baranagar, Dum Dum, Rabindra Sarobar & Kavi Subhash have connections to interchange with Kolkata Suburban Railway. Shyambazar, Mahatma Gandhi Road, Esplanade, Kalighat. The EM Bypass can be accessed from the Shahid Khudiram metro station and Kavi Subhash metro station.

=== Extension up to New Garia (2010) ===
Mamata Banerjee during her first tenure as the railway minister initiated the project of Tollygunge – Garia metro extension. During her second tenure (2009–2011) she inaugurated the extension, and also introduced new Air Conditioned rakes, manufactured indigenously at the Integral Coach Factory.

The new extension to Garia Bazar in the south opened to the public on 23 August 2009. The Garia Bazar station was named after Kavi Nazrul. A final extension, in the southern end, from Kavi Nazrul (Garia Bazar) to Kavi Subhash (New Garia) was inaugurated on 7 October 2010, bringing the total number of stations to 23. On the same day, two Air-Conditioned rakes were also pressed into service.

=== Extension up to Noapara (2013) and Dakshineswar (2021) ===
The line was extended up to Noapara from Dum Dum on 10 July 2013. The line was further extended from Noapara to Dakshineswar (4.1 km) is now complete & operational. It will be met by a metro line from Barrackpore at Baranagar (12.5 km). Trial runs for this stretch started on 23 December 2020, after delay due to COVID-19 pandemic. The stretch was inaugurated on 22 February 2021 & commercial operations began from the following day.

The stations on this stretch are :

1. Noapara
2. Baranagar
3. Dakshineswar

== Features ==
=== Technical features ===
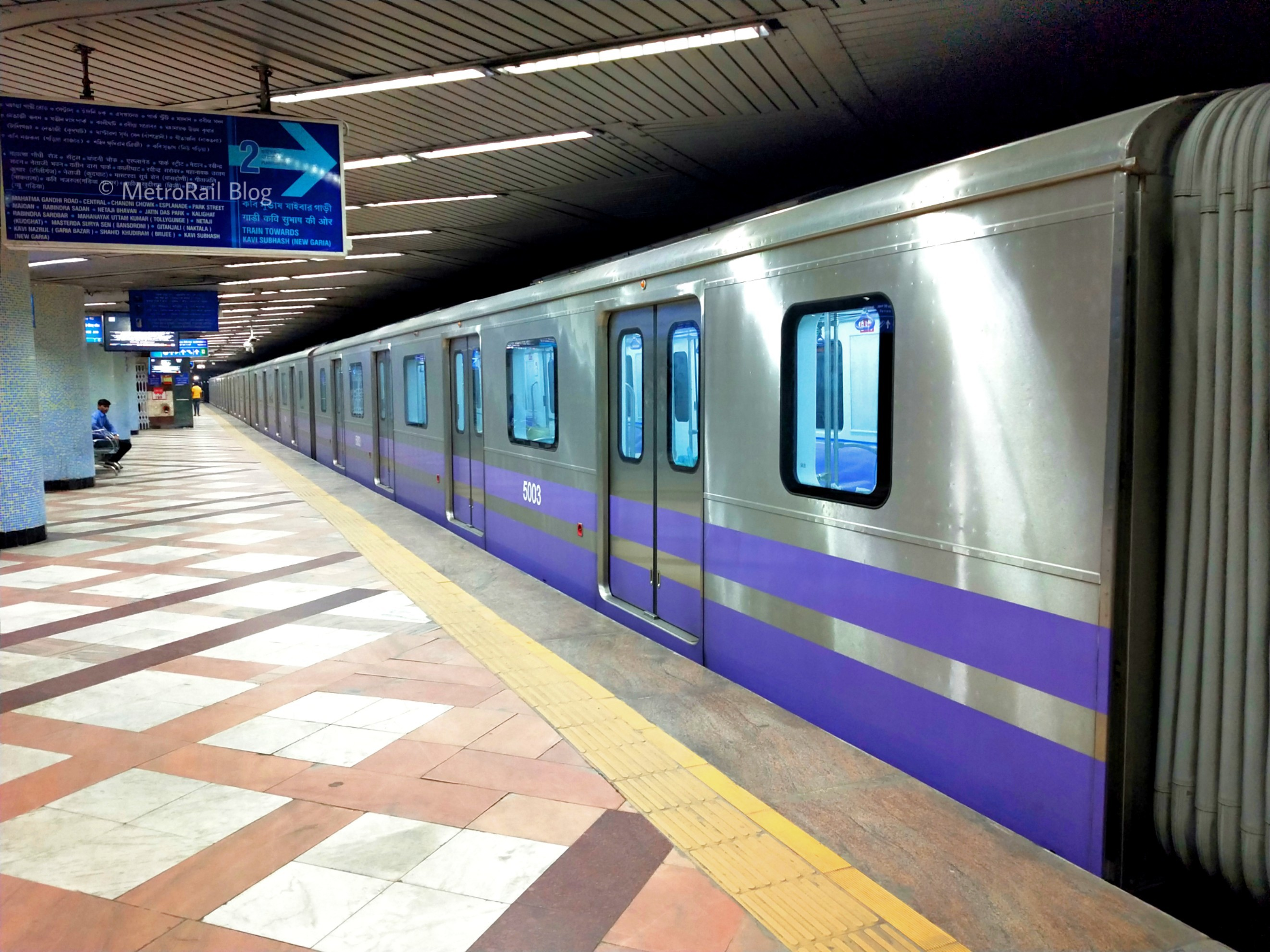
Rake at Girish Park metro station.

Metro construction itself is very complex in nature requiring the application of several new technologies in the fields of civil, electrical, signaling and telecommunication engineering. Indian engineers were backed by their own experience and supplemented by their studies abroad and adopted advanced technologies in the following fields for the first time in India.

- Cut and cover method of construction using diaphragm walls and sheet piles.
- Use of extensive decking to keep the traffic flowing over the cut while construction is in progress underneath.
- Shield tunneling using compressed air and airlocks.
- Ballastless track using elastic fastenings, rubber pads, epoxy mortar and nylon inserts.
- Air-conditioning and ventilation system for environmental control of stations and tunnels.
- Third Rail current collection system for traction.
- Underground substations with dry-type transformers and SF_{6} circuit breakers.
- Tunnel-Train VHF-radio communication system.
- Microprocessor-based train control and supervisory remote control system for substations.
- Automatic ticket vending and checking system.

=== Salient features ===
Total route length	32.13 km (19.96 mi)
Stations	26 (15 underground, 2 on the surface and 9 elevated)
Gauge	1,676 mm (5 ft 6.0 in), Indian Broad Gauge
Cars per train	8
Maximum permissible speed	80 km/h (50 mph)
Average speed	30–31 km/h (18.6–19.3 mph)
Voltage	750 V D.C.
Method of current collection	Third Rail
Travel Time: Dakshineswar to Kavi Subhash	62 minutes (approx.)
Headways	Average 10 minutes
Total estimated cost of the project	₹18.25 billion (US$189.5 million) (approx.)
Environment control	Air conditioners are used in all trains.

=== Proposed Feature and Expansion ===
Platform Screen Doors (PSDs) are a system of full height/half height motorized sliding doors that provide controlled access to the trains and protect the platform edge. PSD work is proposed for all stations in this line to minimize accidents common in this route. This plan was proposed after the successful utilization of Platform Screen Doors to keep the number of suicidal cases on the Green Line to absolute zero.

Metro Railway also plans to extend the platform and viaduct of Dakshineswar metro station by ~90 m (300 ft) via erection of two new pillars beyond the current length to facilitate a crossover so that the trains can switch tracks faster in order to increase the frequency of services to the Noapara–Dakshineswar stretch.

== Rolling stock ==
=== ICF/BHEL ===
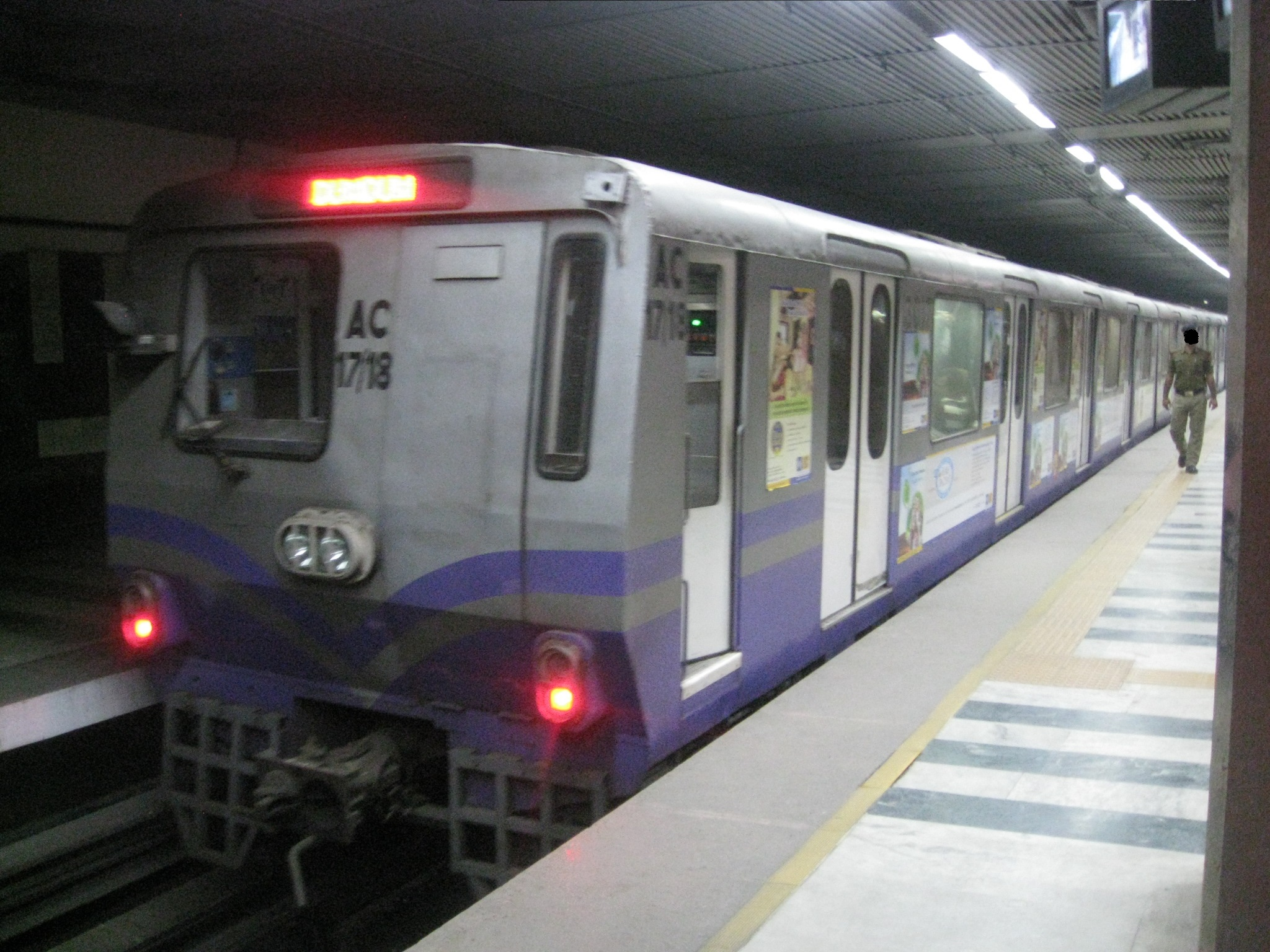

=== ICF/MEDHA ===
ICF/MEDHA rake
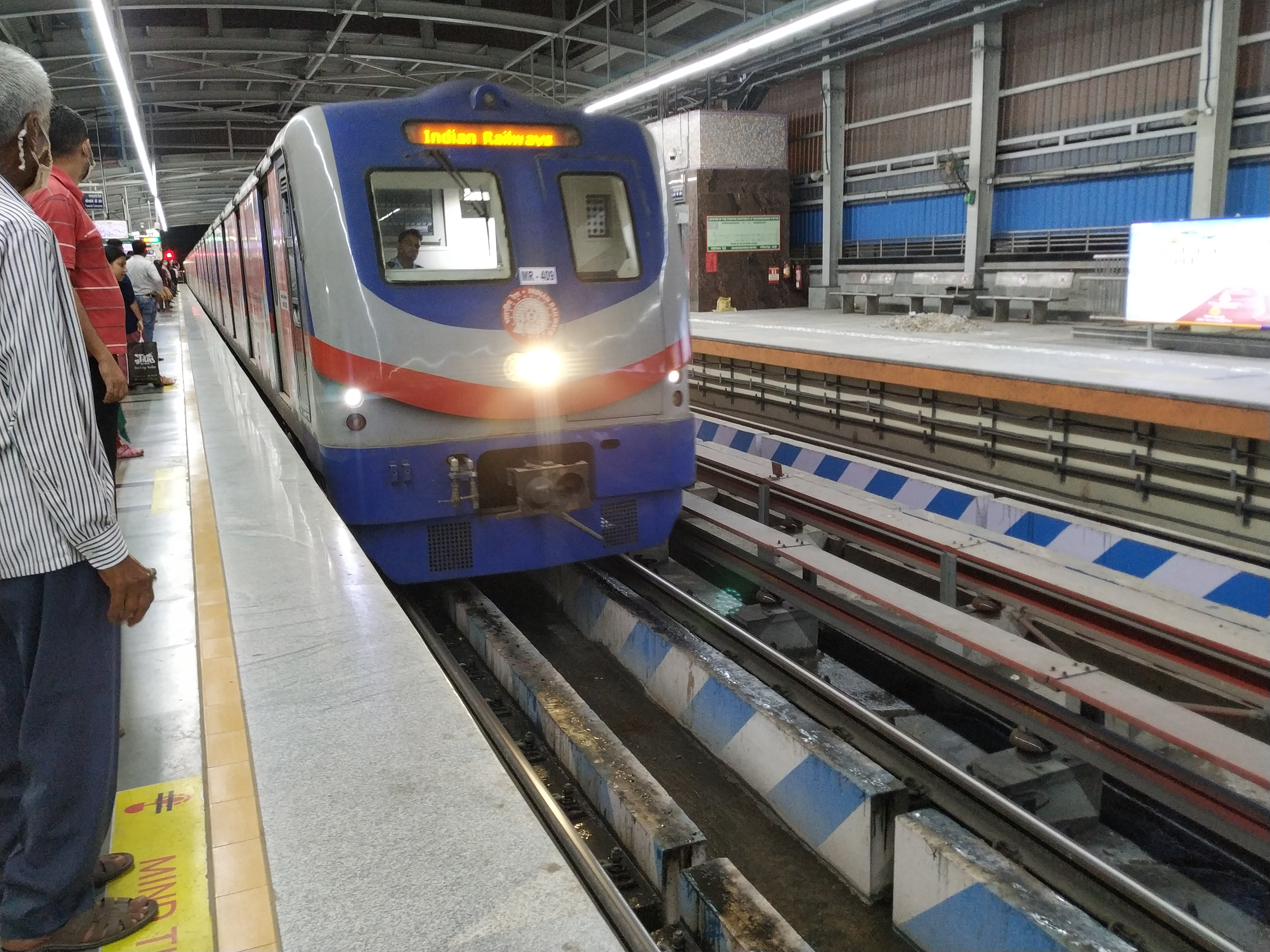
- MEDHA metro rake at Dakshineswar metro station
- In service: 2019–present
- Manufacturers: Integral Coach Factory and Medha Servo Drives Private Limited
- Designer: Integral Coach Factory
- Assembly: Chennai, India
- Family name: ICF 4000 series
- Number built: 18
- Number in service: 18
- Formation: 2DTC+4MC+2TC
- Design code: MR-40n
- Capacity: 3,520
- Operator: Metro Railway, Kolkata
- Depots: Noapara Depot; New Garia Depot; Joka Depot
- Lines served: Blue Line; Purple Line; Orange Line; Yellow Line

Specifications
- Car length: 19.5 m
- Width: 2.74 m
- Height: 3.625 m
- Doors: Automatic Sliding doors
- Maximum speed: 90 kmph
- Traction motors: 204 kW /3 phase
- Power output: 3264 HP
- Acceleration: 0.85 m/s^{2}
- Deceleration: 1.1 m/s^{2}
- HVAC: Air conditioned
- Current collection: Contact shoe
- Bogies: ICF bogie
- Braking system: Regenerative braking
- Coupling system: Scharfenberg coupler
- Seating: Longitudinal facing seats
- Track gauge: 5 ft 6 in (1,676 mm) Indian gauge

=== CRRC Dalian ===
CRRC Dalian rake
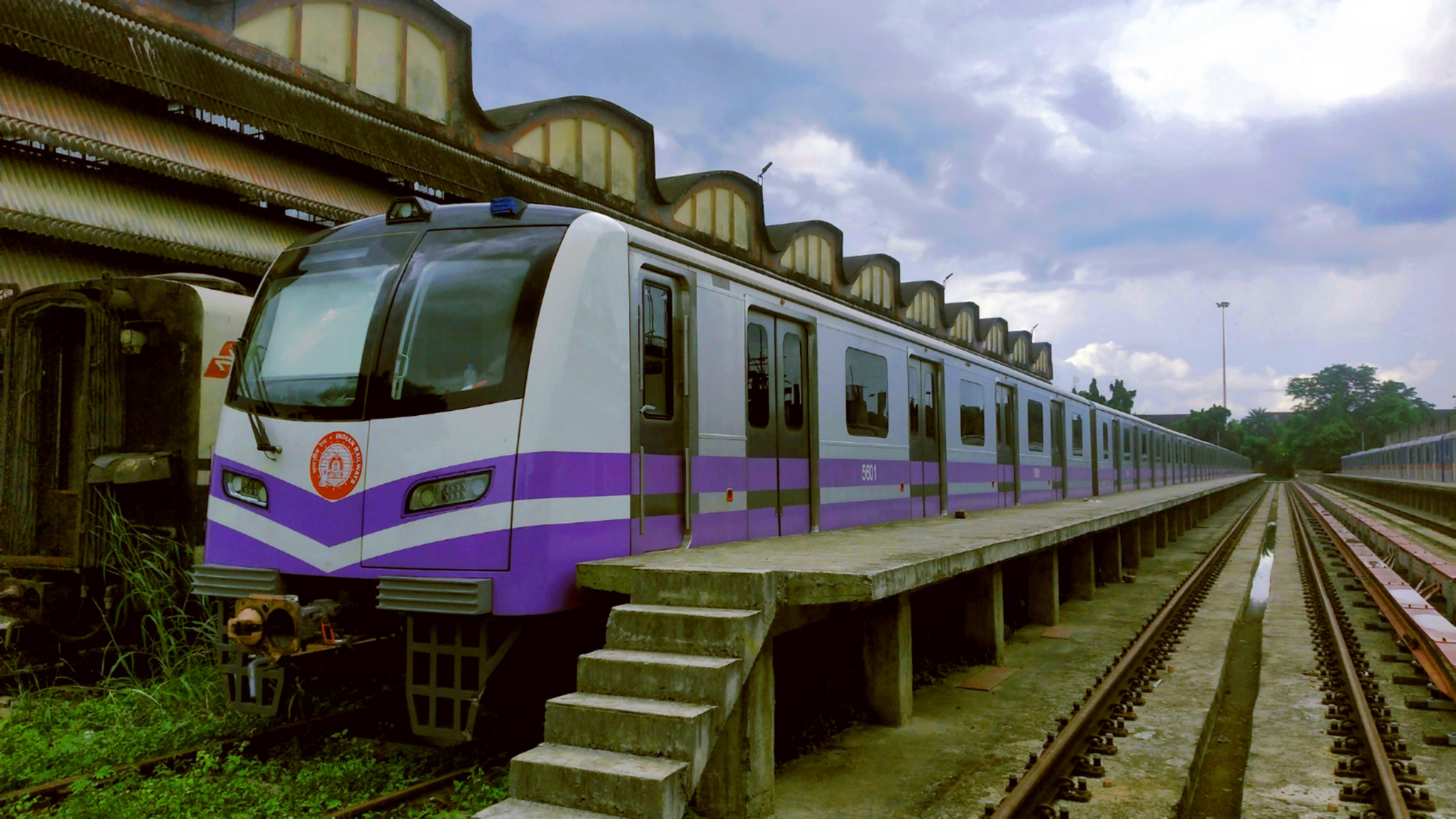
- The first rake at Noapara depot
- Manufacturer: CRRC
- Assembly: Dalian, China
- Number built: 16
- Number in service: 2
- Design code: MR-50n
- Operator: Metro Railway, Kolkata
- Depot: Noapara
- Lines served: Blue line Yellow Line

Specifications
- Car length: 19.5 m
- Width: 2.74 m
- Height: 3.65 m
- Floor height: 1.13 m
- Wheel diameter: 860 mm
- Maximum speed: 80 kmph
- Axle load: 17 tons
- Power supply: 750 V DC
- HVAC: Air conditioned
- Electric system: Third rail
- Current collection: Contact shoe
- Seating: Longitudinal facing seats
- Track gauge: 5 ft 6 in (1,676 mm) Indian gauge

Notes/references
- Passenger operation Started on 17th march 2023

There was a need to replace non-AC rakes on Blue line and so during mid 2015 it was announced that Indian Railways for the first time would rope an international train-maker, China Railway Rolling Stock Corporation (CRRC) based in Dalian. As per the tender, 14 new rakes composed of 8 coaches each will be supplied to Kolkata Metro by CNR Dalian, a subsidiary of CRRC Dalian, which will be running on Blue Line. These rakes will be of ultra-modern technology. They will have doors that will be 20 cm (7.9 in) wider than any other metro rails in India. They will have wide vestibules, 2 feet 6 inches (0.76 m) wider than the existing trains. The design consists of the aerodynamic front with large doors and LED Lights, and violet colored stripe on silver color body. These rakes are capable of a top speed of 80 km/h (50 mph). The first of the 14 rakes from Chinese firm Dalian was slated to arrive by December 2017 but got delayed due to various reasons. The first rake finally arrived in Kolkata on 3 March 2019 on a vessel at Netaji Subhash dock of Kolkata port. Each of the 8 coaches of the rake weigh nearly 45 tonnes. The rake was unloaded and taken to Noapara Carshed, after which trial runs and inspection would be carried out before commencing operations. Other 13 rakes are ready, but the shipment got delayed due to the ongoing coronavirus pandemic.

These rakes were under performance trials for more than 20 months as serious problems related to performance of the rake were identified during trials. Some of the issues related to insufficient power to climb up the slopes in the tunnels and higher oscillation in the bogie.

On 17 March 2023, the first Dalian rake was inducted into service. Another 3 rakes will arrive soon.

=== Old fleet ===
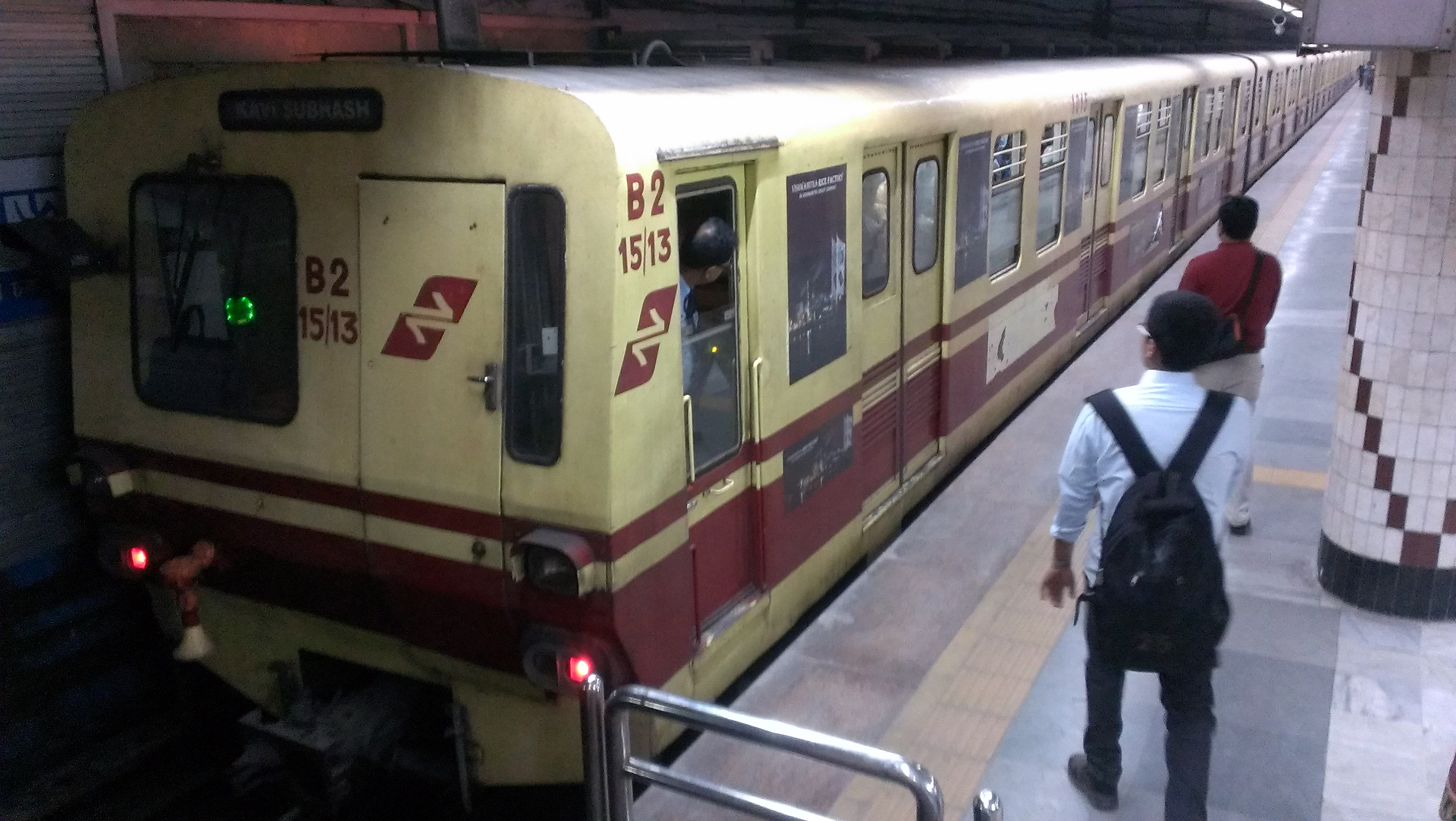
Kolkata Metro Old fleet, Discontinued in 2021

The whole fleet is vestibuled. Carbodies and mechanical components were made by ICF with electrical components made by NGEF, Bangalore. The fleet is unique in that it is the only railroad equipment in India with end-mounted cab doors (except for some of the WAG-6 series locomotives).

ICF has specifically designed, manufactured and supplied these cars for the first underground railway system. The special features incorporated are:

- Traction power supply through third rail current collection system.
- Automatic door opening/closing and continuous monitoring of the transit.
- Automatic Train Stop (ATS) system which will automatically apply the brakes in case of human failure.
- Automatic train operation (ATO) with the driver acting as the train supervisor (optional).
- A public address system is provided on the trains to announce approaching stations. A central dispatcher can contact any of the train crew and also make important announcements directly to passengers over the system.

With all these features, the design and manufacturing process of these cars to a standard of reliability and safety has been a challenge.

== Reservation for women ==
In 2008, the Kolkata Metro Railway experimented with the practice of reserving two entire compartments for women.

This system was found to be ineffective and caused inconvenience for a lot of commuters (including women) and the plan was eventually dropped by the metro authority. But a certain section of seats in each of the eight compartments is reserved for women.

== Problems with this line ==
The founder of Delhi Metro, E. Sreedharan said Indian Railways are not experts at urban transport, and misplanned the Kolkata metro from the beginning. A private company should run the metro and can bring it up to standard in five years.

Since Kolkata Metro is under Indian Railways, it can't take its own independent decisions. It has to rely on Indian Railways for everything (like rakes etc.). The rakes are ordered directly from ICF without floating any global tenders.

== See also ==
- List of Kolkata metro stations
- Kolkata Metro Rolling Stock
- Trams in Kolkata
- Kolkata Suburban Railway
