= Netaji Bhavan metro station =

Metro station in Kolkata, India

Netaji Bhavan
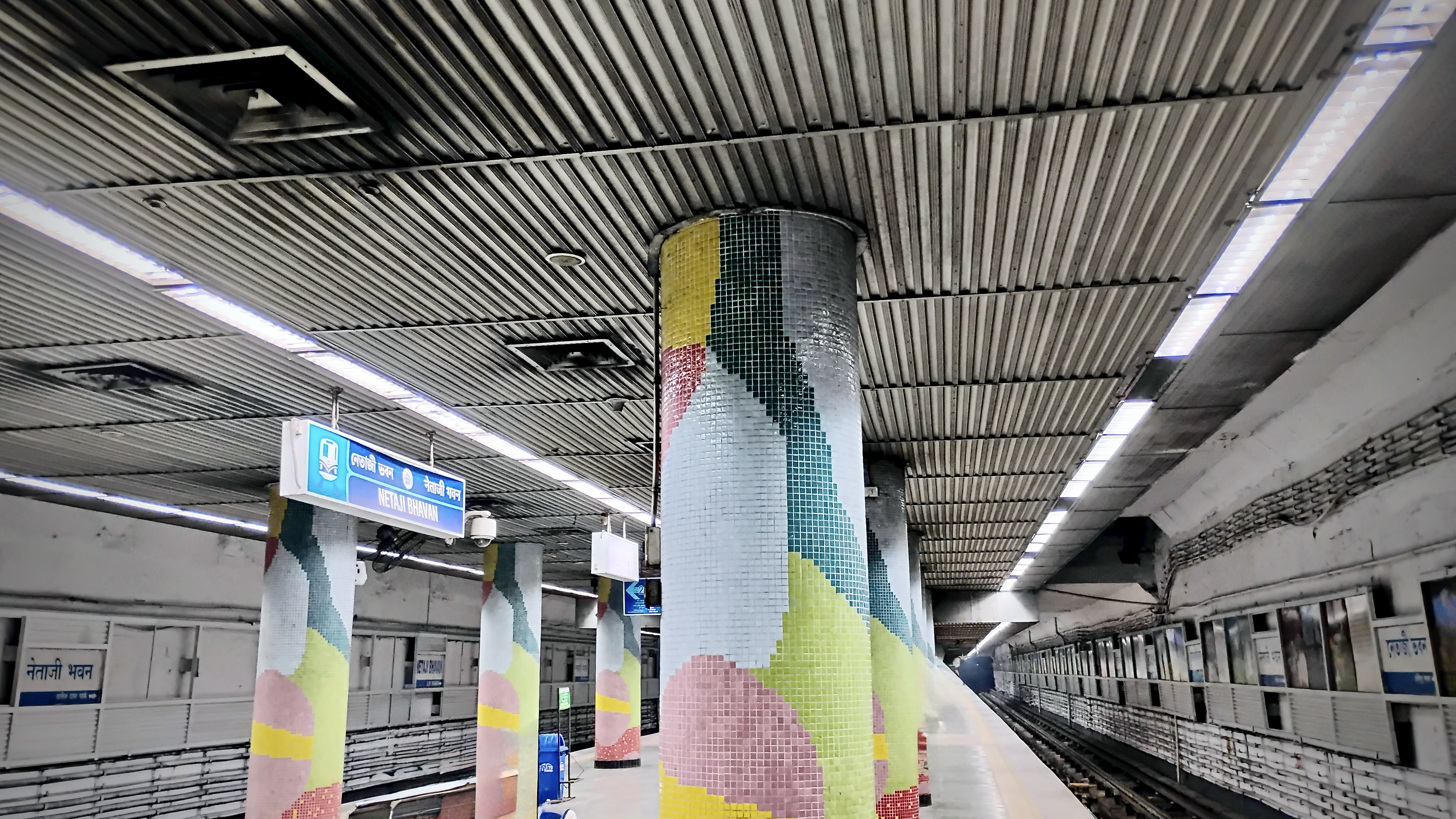
- Netaji Bhavan metro station

General information
- Location: Ashutosh Mukherjee Rd., Bhawanipore; Kolkata, West Bengal 700025; India
- Coordinates: 22.53297°N 88.34571°E
- System: Kolkata Metro
- Operator: Metro Railway, Kolkata
- Line: Blue Line
- Platforms: 2 (1 Island platform)

Construction
- Structure type: Underground
- Accessible: Yes

Other information
- Station code: KNBN

History
- Opened: 24 October 1984; 41 years ago
- Former names: Bhawanipore

Services
Preceding station	Kolkata Metro	Following station
Rabindra Sadan towards Dakshineswar	Blue Line	Jatin Das Park towards Shahid Khudiram
Route map
Location

Netaji Bhavan is an underground metro station on the North-South corridor of the Blue Line of Kolkata Metro in Bhowanipore, Kolkata, West Bengal, India.

This name is from Netaji Bhawan, the nearby memorial hall and museum of Subhas Chandra Bose ("Netaji"). Scenes of the Netaji's life are painted inside the station.

== History ==
In 1984, when the Metro opened in Kolkata (then Calcutta), it was the southern most station. The station at that time was "Bhawanipore". Later the name was changed to Netaji Bhawan.

In April 2018, the station was recognised as the best-maintained on the then north–south line (now the Blue Line) by Metro Railway general manager Ajay Vijayvargiya during the 63rd Railway Week celebrations. The station had earlier been designated an all-women–operated station on 8 March 2018 to mark International Women’s Day, with women employees serving as station superintendent, shift in-charge, booking clerks, security personnel, porters, cleaners and point operators. Metro Railway officials reported improvements in cleanliness and passenger management, noting that commuters had responded positively to the changes at one of the network’s oldest stations.

== Station layout ==
G	Street level	Exit/Entrance
L1	Mezannine	Fare control, station agent, Ticket/token, shops, crossover
L2	Platform 2	Train towards Shahid Khudiram (Jatin Das Park) →
L2	Island platform, Doors will open on the right
L2	Platform 1	← Train towards Dakshineswar (Rabindra Sadan)

== Entry/Exit ==
- 1 – Ramrik Hospital
- 2 – Main Gate
- 3 – Chakraberia Road
- 4 – Jadubabur Bazar

== See also ==
- Kolkata
- List of Kolkata Metro stations
- Transport in Kolkata
- Kolkata Metro Rail Corporation
- Kolkata Suburban Railway
- Kolkata Monorail
- Trams in Kolkata
- Bhowanipore
- E.M. Bypass
- List of rapid transit systems
- List of metro systems
