= Rabindra Sadan metro station =

Metro station in Kolkata, India

Rabindra Sadan
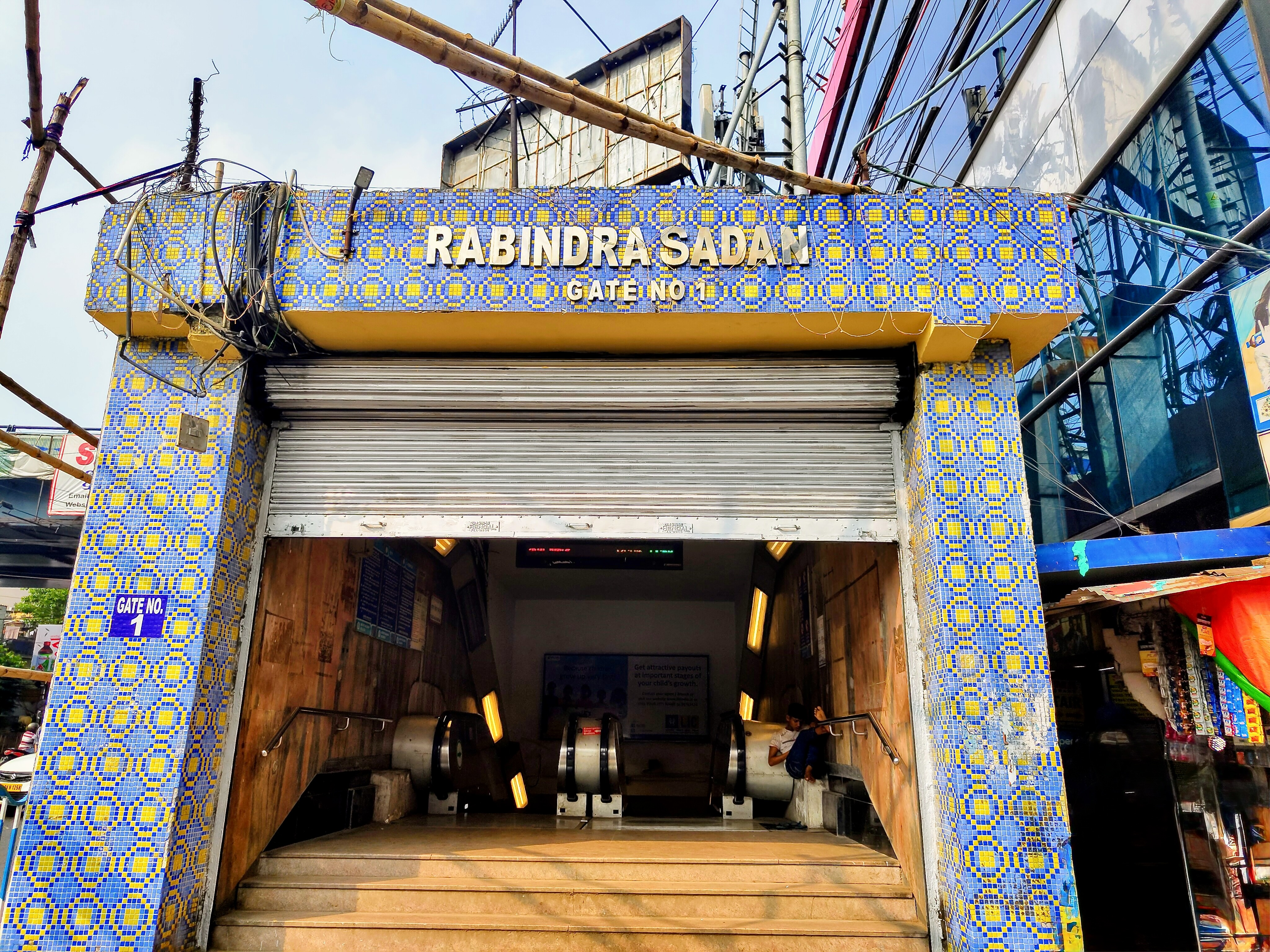
- Gate 1 of Rabindra Sadan station

General information
- Location: Chowringhee Road, Exide crossing Kolkata, West Bengal 700020
- Coordinates: 22.54122°N 88.34727°E
- System: Kolkata Metro
- Operator: Metro Railway, Kolkata
- Line: Blue Line
- Platforms: 2 (1 island platform)

Construction
- Structure type: Underground
- Accessible: No

Other information
- Station code: KRSD

History
- Opened: 24 October 1984; 41 years ago

Services
Preceding station	Kolkata Metro	Following station
Maidan towards Dakshineswar	Blue Line	Netaji Bhavan towards Shahid Khudiram
Route map
Location

Rabindra Sadan is the busiest underground metro station on the North-South corridor of the Blue Line of Kolkata Metro in Kolkata, West Bengal, India. It is named after the nearby Rabindra Sadan cultural centre and theatre. The station is located at the junction of Chowringhee Road and AJC Bose Road.

== Station layout ==
G	Street level	Exit/Entrance
L1	Mezannine	Fare control, station agent, Ticket/token, shops, crossover
L2	Platform 2	Train towards Shahid Khudiram (Netaji Bhavan) →
L2	Island platform, Doors will open on the right
L2	Platform 1	← Train towards Dakshineswar (Maidan)

== See also ==
- Kolkata
- List of Kolkata Metro stations
- Transport in Kolkata
- Kolkata Metro Rail Corporation
- Kolkata Suburban Railway
- Kolkata Monorail
- Trams in Kolkata
- Bhowanipore
- Chowringhee Road
- List of rapid transit systems
- List of metro systems
