= Jatin Das Park metro station =

Metro station in Kolkata, India

Jatin Das Park
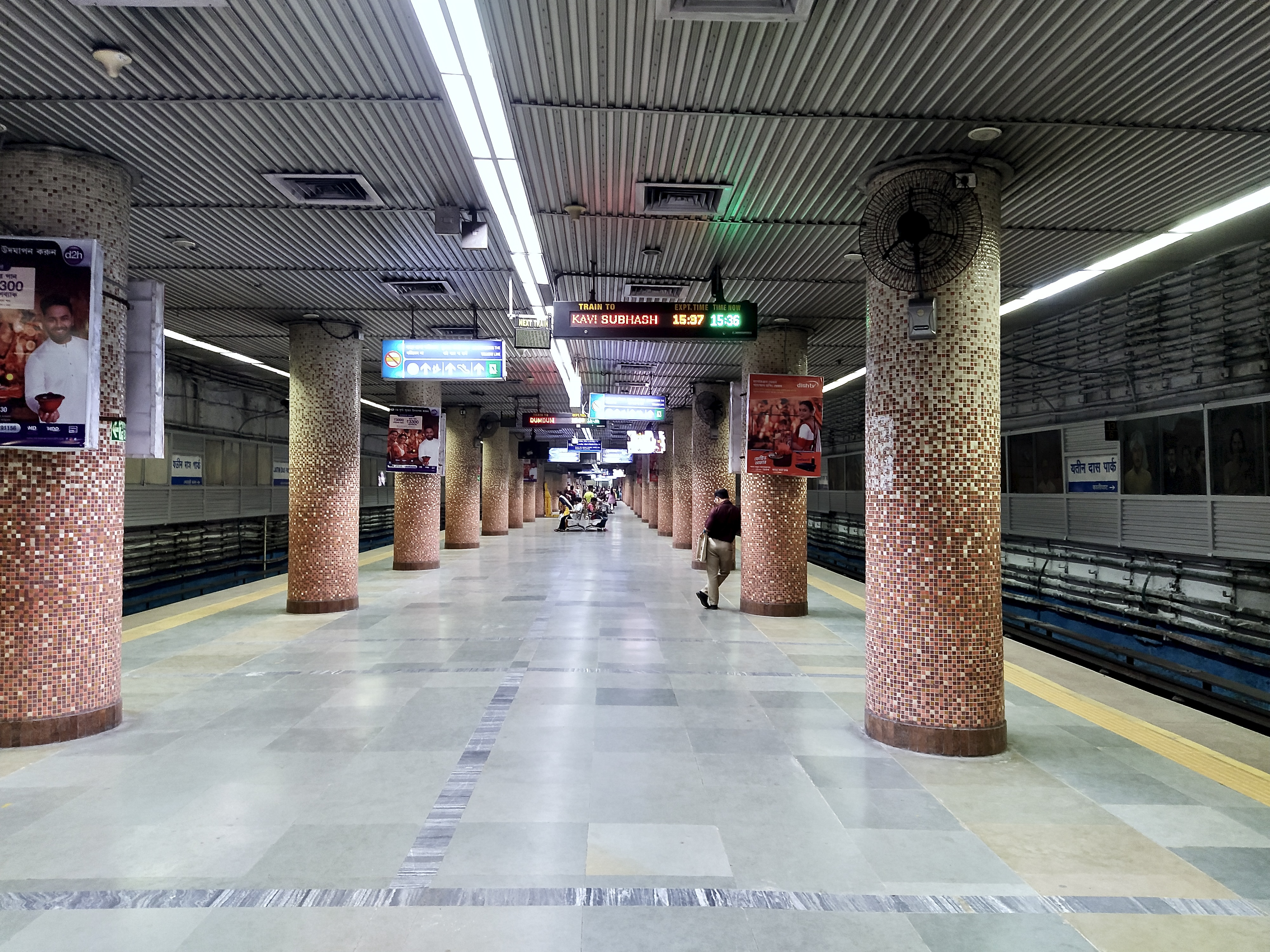
- Jatin Das Park platform level

General information
- Location: Hazra, Kalighat; Kolkata, West Bengal 700025; India
- Coordinates: 22.52426°N 88.34648°E
- System: Kolkata Metro
- Operator: Metro Railway, Kolkata
- Line: Blue Line
- Platforms: 2 (1 Island platform)

Construction
- Structure type: Underground
- Accessible: No

Other information
- Station code: KJPK

History
- Opened: 29 April 1986; 40 years ago

Services
Preceding station	Kolkata Metro	Following station
Netaji Bhavan towards Dakshineswar	Blue Line	Kalighat towards Shahid Khudiram
Route map
Location

Jatin Das Park is an underground metro station on the North-South corridor of the Blue Line of Kolkata Metro at Hazra, Kalighat, Kolkata, West Bengal, India. It is named after Indian independence activist and revolutionary Jatindra Nath Das.

== Station layout ==
G	Street level	Exit/Entrance
L1	Mezannine	Fare control, station agent, Ticket/token, shops, crossover
L2	Platform 2	Train towards Shahid Khudiram (Kalighat) →
L2	Island platform, Doors will open on the right
L2	Platform 1	← Train towards Dakshineswar (Netaji Bhavan)

== Entry/Exit ==
- 1 – Asutosh College
- 2 –
- 3 – Chittaranjan Seba Sadan, Hazra
- 4 – Jogesh Mime Academy
- 5 – Hazra Road, Beltala
- 6 – Kalighat Temple, Sadananda Rd
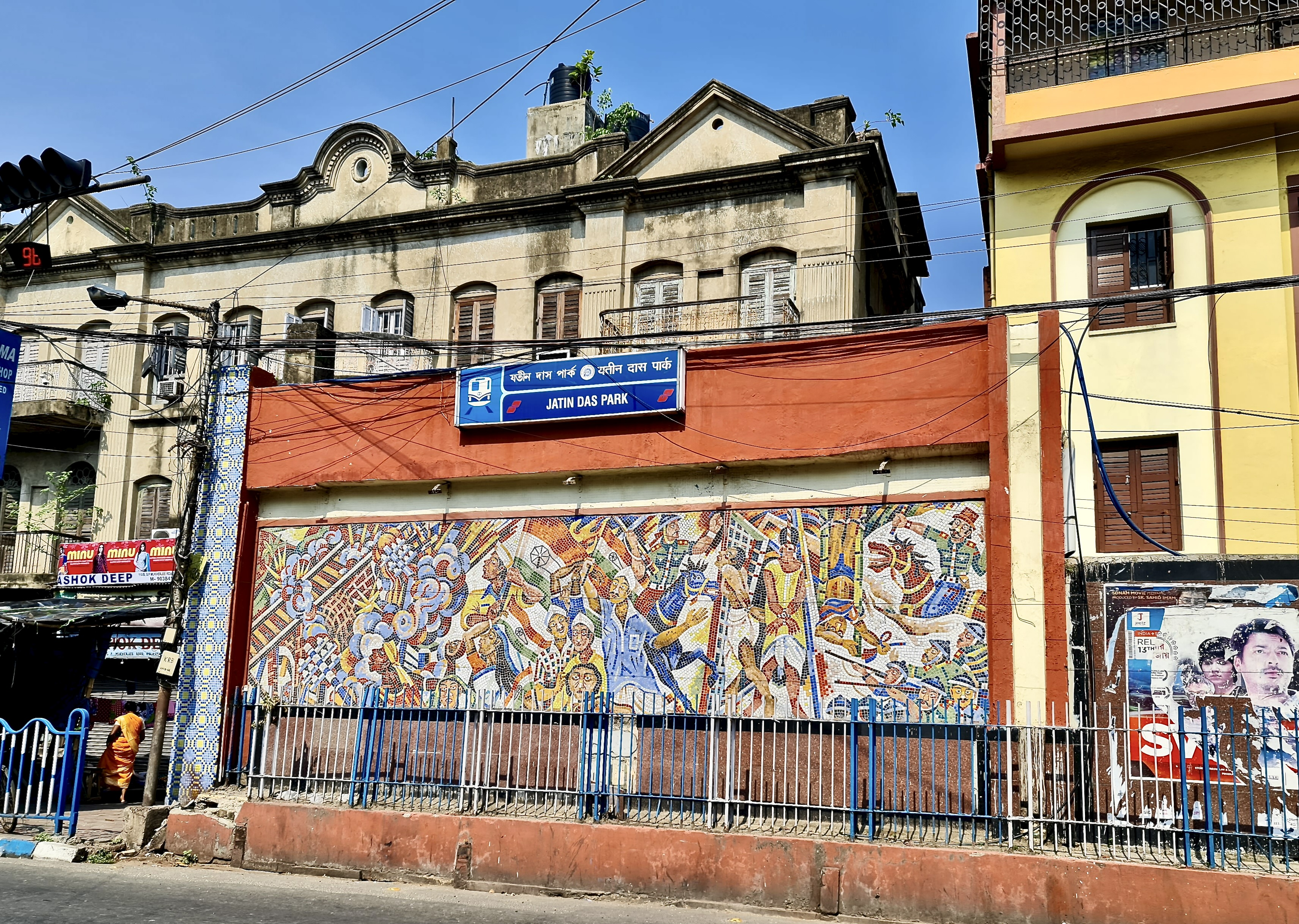
Murals on one of the entry gates

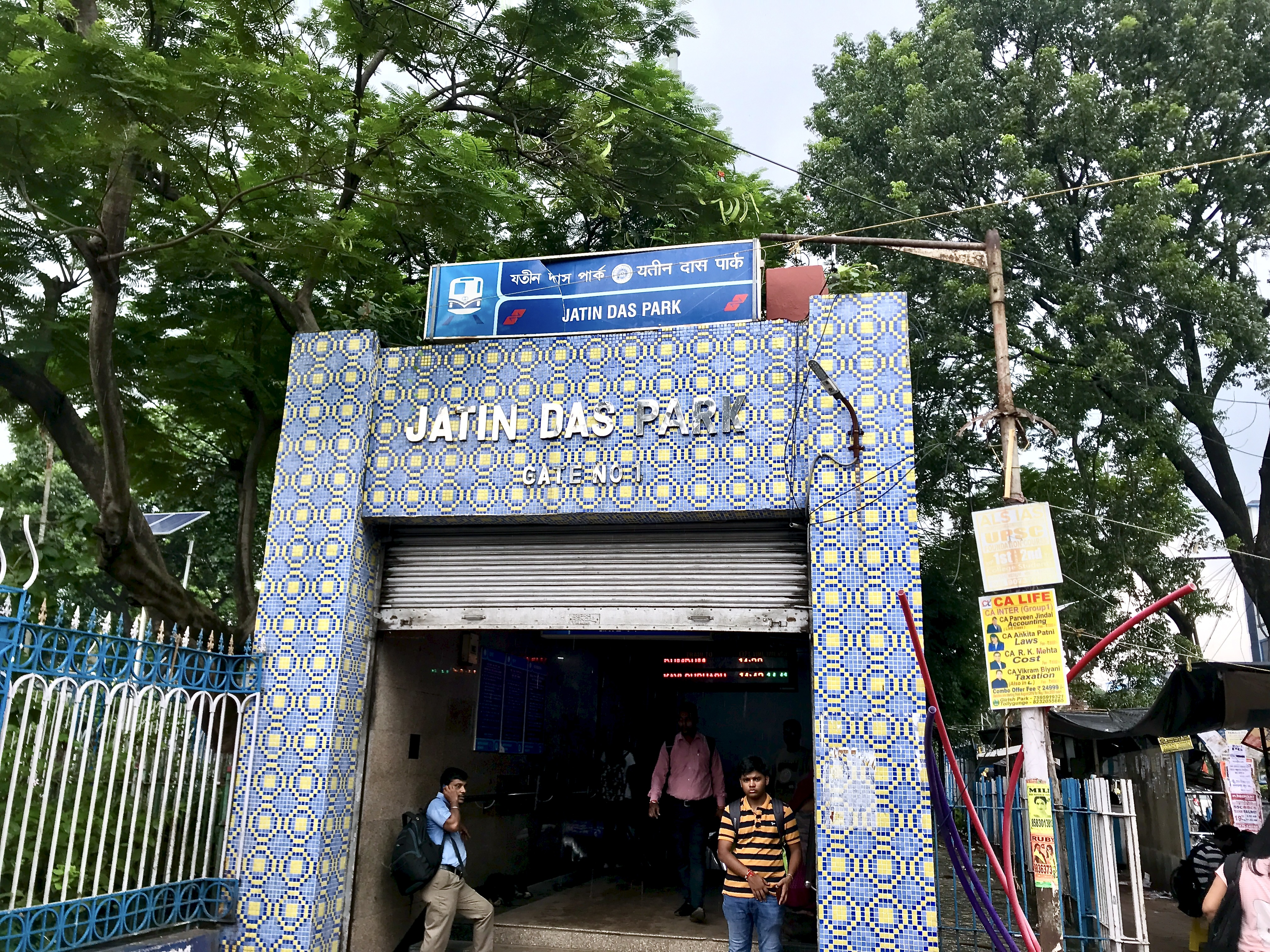
Gate no. 1

== Connections ==
=== Bus ===
Bus route number 1, 1A, 3B, 3C/1, 12C/1B, 13A, 13C, 17B, 18B/1, 18C, 21, 21/1, 37A, 40A, 40B, 41, 41B, 42A, 45B, 47/1, 47B, 80A, 80B, 204/1, 205, 208, 218/1, 228, 234/1, SD8, SD16, K7, 1A (Mini), 11A (Mini), 32 (Mini), S107/1 (Mini), S108/2 (Mini), S112 (Mini), S113 (Mini), S114 (Mini), S116 (Mini), S117 (Mini), S118 (Mini), S131 (Mini), S135 (Mini), S178 (Mini), S188 (Mini), E1, M7B, S2, S4C, S5, S5C, S6A, S7, S9A, S10A, S15G, S17A, S60, 33, AC1, AC5, AC6, AC24, AC24A, AC49A etc. serve the station.

== See also ==
- Kolkata
- List of Kolkata Metro stations
- Transport in Kolkata
- Kolkata Metro Rail Corporation
- Kolkata Suburban Railway
- Kolkata Monorail
- Trams in Kolkata
- Tollygunge
- E.M. Bypass
- List of rapid transit systems
- List of metro systems
