= Kalaikunda railway station =

Railway Station in West Bengal

General information
- Location: Kalaikunda Siding Road, Kharagpur, Paschim Medinipur district, West Bengal; India
- Coordinates: 22.329436°N 87.244259°E
- Elevation: 62 m (203 ft)
- System: Passenger train station
- Owner: Indian Railways
- Operator: South Eastern Railway
- Line: Howrah–Nagpur–Mumbai line
- Platforms: 4

Construction
- Structure type: Standard (on ground station)

Other information
- Status: Functioning
- Station code: KKQ
- Zone(s): South Eastern Railway zone
- Division(s): Kharagpur railway division

History
- Former names: Bengal Nagpur Railway
Location
- Location within India Location within West Bengal

Kalaikunda railway station is a railway station on Howrah–Nagpur–Mumbai line under Kharagpur railway division of South Eastern Railway zone. It is situated at Kharagpur in Paschim Medinipur district in the Indian state of West Bengal. It is 9 km (6 mi) from Kharagpur Junction.
