= Kalighat metro station =

Metro station in Kolkata, India

Kalighat
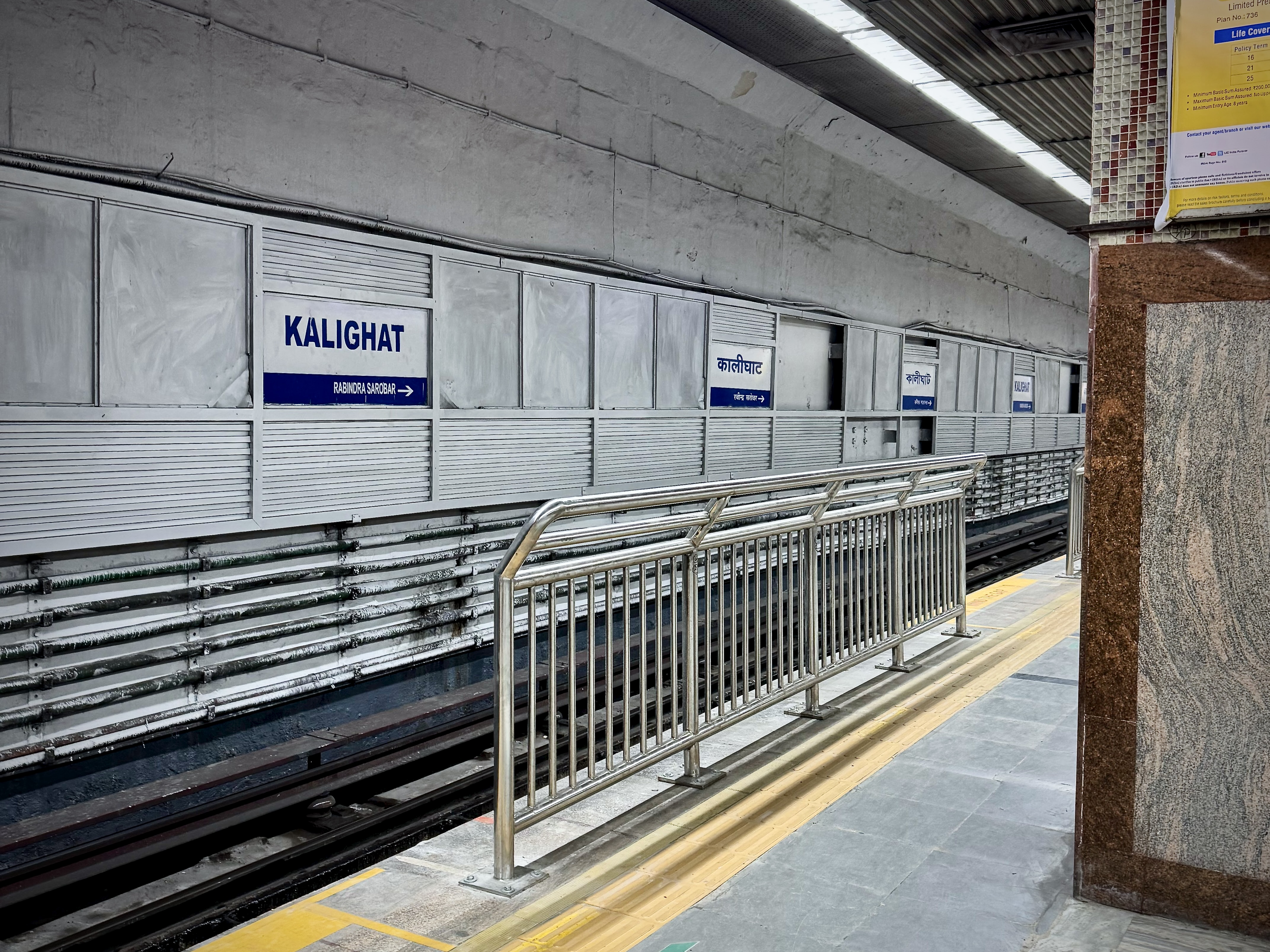

General information
- Location: Rashbehari Avenue, Kalighat; Kolkata, West Bengal 700029; India
- Coordinates: 22.516652°N 88.346003°E
- System: Kolkata Metro
- Operator: Metro Railway, Kolkata
- Line: Blue Line
- Platforms: 2 (1 island platforms)

Construction
- Structure type: Underground
- Accessible: No

Other information
- Station code: KKHG

History
- Opened: 29 April 1986; 40 years ago

Services
Preceding station	Kolkata Metro	Following station
Jatin Das Park towards Dakshineswar	Blue Line	Rabindra Sarobar towards Shahid Khudiram
Route map
Location

Kalighat is an underground metro station on the North-South corridor of the Blue Line of Kolkata Metro at Rashbehari Avenue in Kalighat, Kolkata, West Bengal, India.

== Station layout ==
G	Street level	Exit/Entrance
L1	Mezannine	Fare control, station agent, Ticket/token, shops, crossover
L2	Platform 2	Train towards Shahid Khudiram (Rabindra Sarobar) →
L2	Island platform, Doors will open on the right
L2	Platform 1	← Train towards Dakshineswar (Jatin Das Park)

== Entry/Exits ==
- 1 – Kali Temple, Kalighat Post Office, Catholic Church, Nirmal Hriday Orphanage
- 3/4/5 – Tollygunge P.S., Muktangan, Southern Ave., P.S.C. Building, Lake Market, Lake Mall, Charu Chandra College, Deshapriya Park, Gariahat Crossing, Rashbehari Ave.
- 8 – Chetla Central Rd., Keoratala Burning Ghat, Pratapaditya Rd.
- 9/10 – Gurudwara, Chetla Boys' School, Sadananda Rd.

== Connections ==
=== Tram ===
Tram route number 24/29 serves the station.

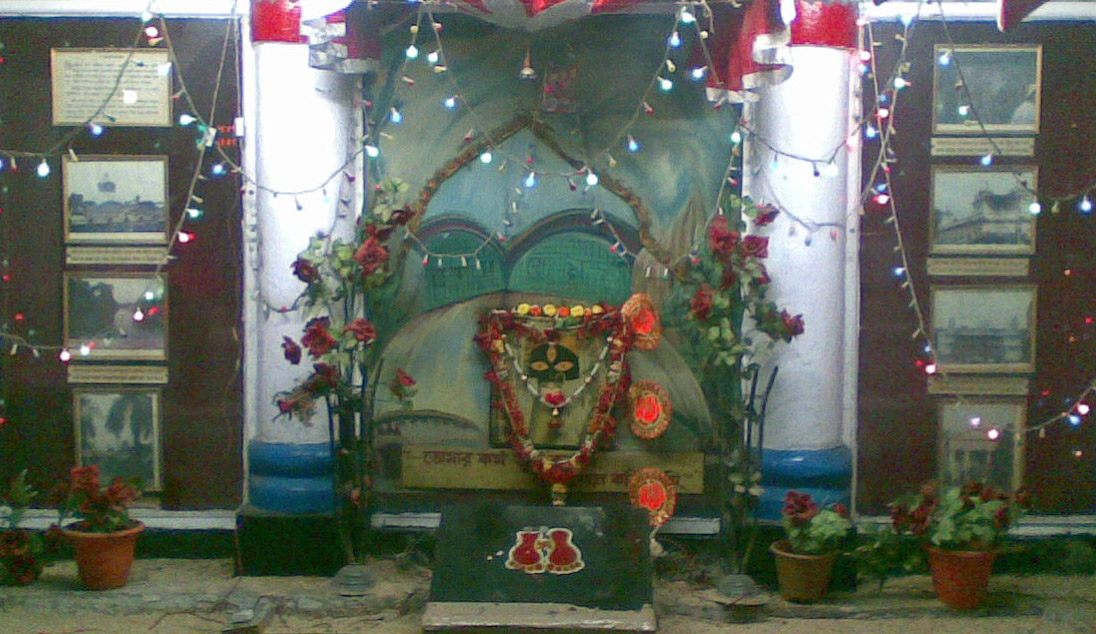
Shrine of Mother Kali at the station

== See also ==
- Kolkata
- List of Kolkata Metro stations
- Transport in Kolkata
- Kolkata Metro Rail Corporation
- Kolkata Suburban Railway
- Kolkata Monorail
- Trams in Kolkata
- Tollygunge
- E.M. Bypass
- List of rapid transit systems
- List of metro systems
