= Kolkata Metro =

Rapid transit system in Kolkata, West Bengal, India

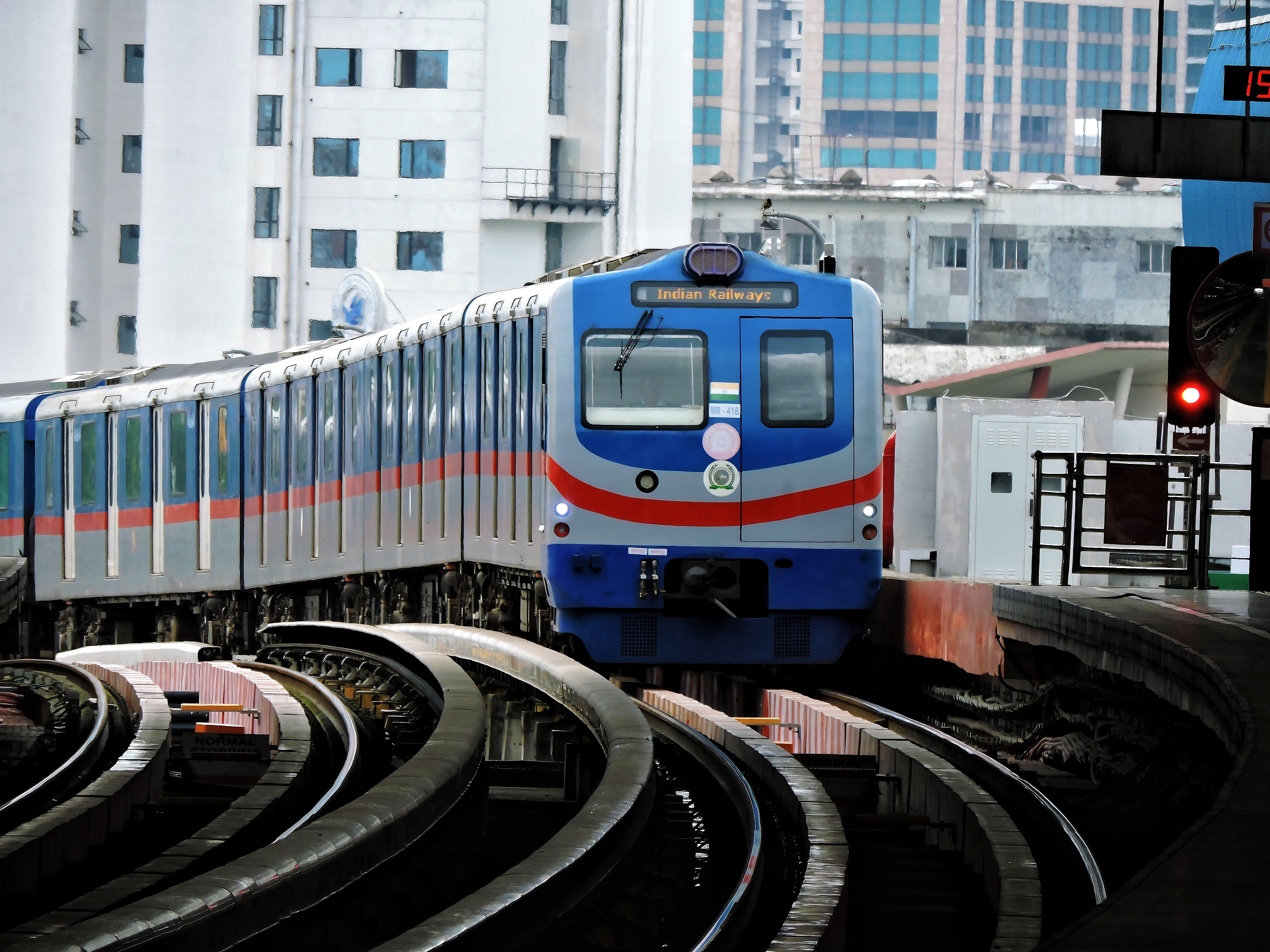

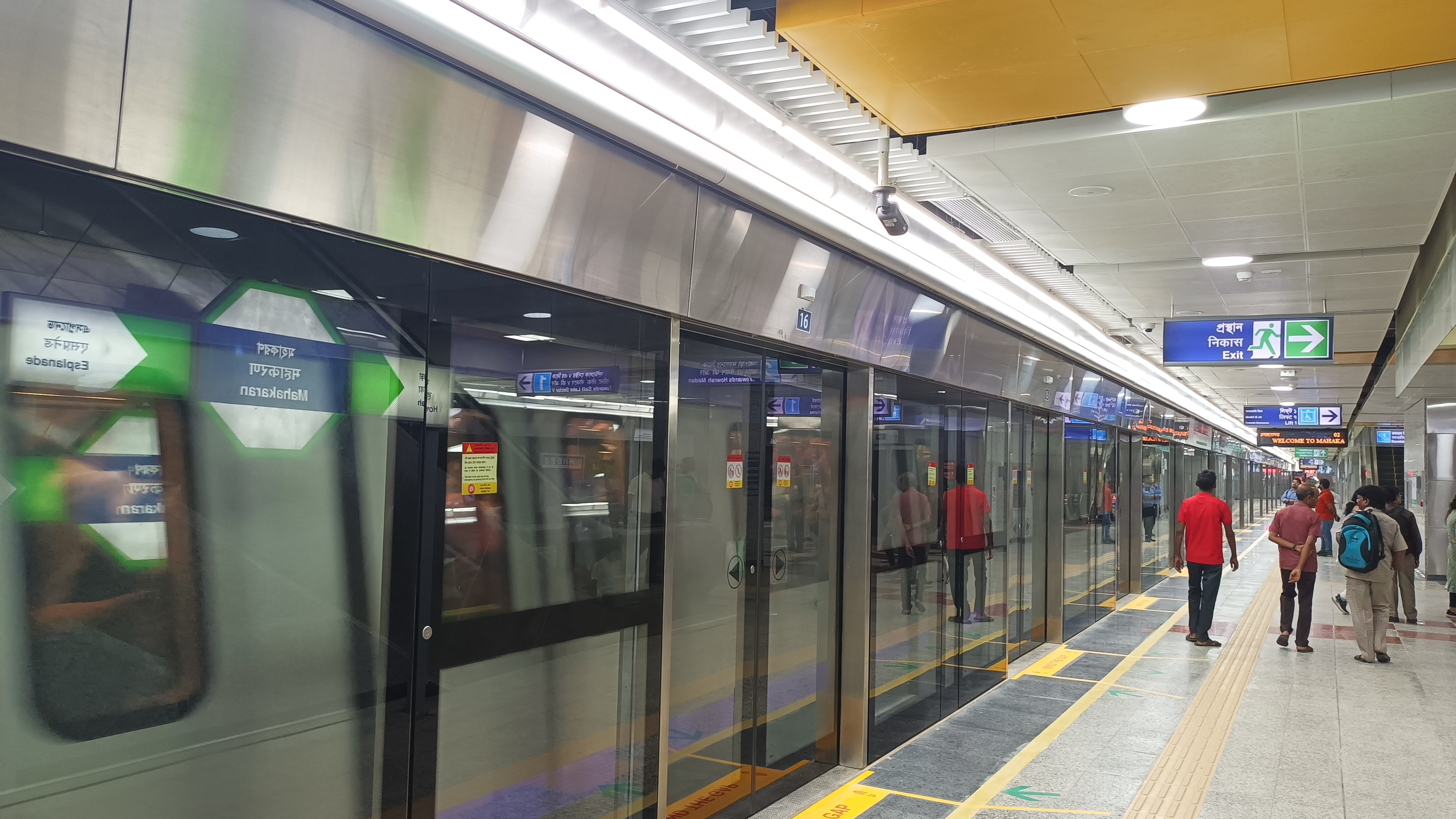
- Top: An ICF MEDHA rake arriving at Hemanta Mukhopadhyay station of the Orange Line. Bottom: A BEML rake departing from Mahakaran station of the Green Line.

Overview
- Owner: Indian Railways
- Locale: Kolkata metropolitan area, West Bengal, India
- Transit type: Rapid transit
- Number of lines: Operational: 5; Approved: 1
- Line number: Blue Line; Green Line; Purple Line; Orange Line; Yellow Line; Pink Line
- Number of stations: Operational: 55 (Note: Interchange stations are counted only once. There are 3 interchange stations. If added the number goes up to 58 stations); Under construction: 22; Approved: 44; Total: 124
- Daily ridership: 6.47 lakh (0.647 million, 2025–26)
- Annual ridership: 23.6 crore (236 million, 2025–26)
- Website: mtp.indianrailways.gov.in; kmrc.in

Operation
- Began operation: 24 October 1984; 42 years ago as Metropolitan Transit Project; 29 December 2010; 15 years ago as a railway zone under Indian Railways
- Operators: Metro Railway, Kolkata; Kolkata Metro Rail Corporation
- Infrastructure manager: Indian Railways
- Character: Elevated, At-grade, Underground
- Train length: 6–8 coaches
- Headway: 6–25 minutes

Technical
- System length: 73.42 km (45.62 mi) (operational); 138.82 km (86.26 mi) (Total proposed)
- Track gauge: 1,676 mm (5 ft 6 in) broad gauge; 1,435 mm (4 ft 8 1/2 in) standard gauge (Note: only Green line)
- Electrification: 750 V DC third rail
- Average speed: 40 km/h (24.85 mph)
- Top speed: 80 km/h (50 mph)
Route map
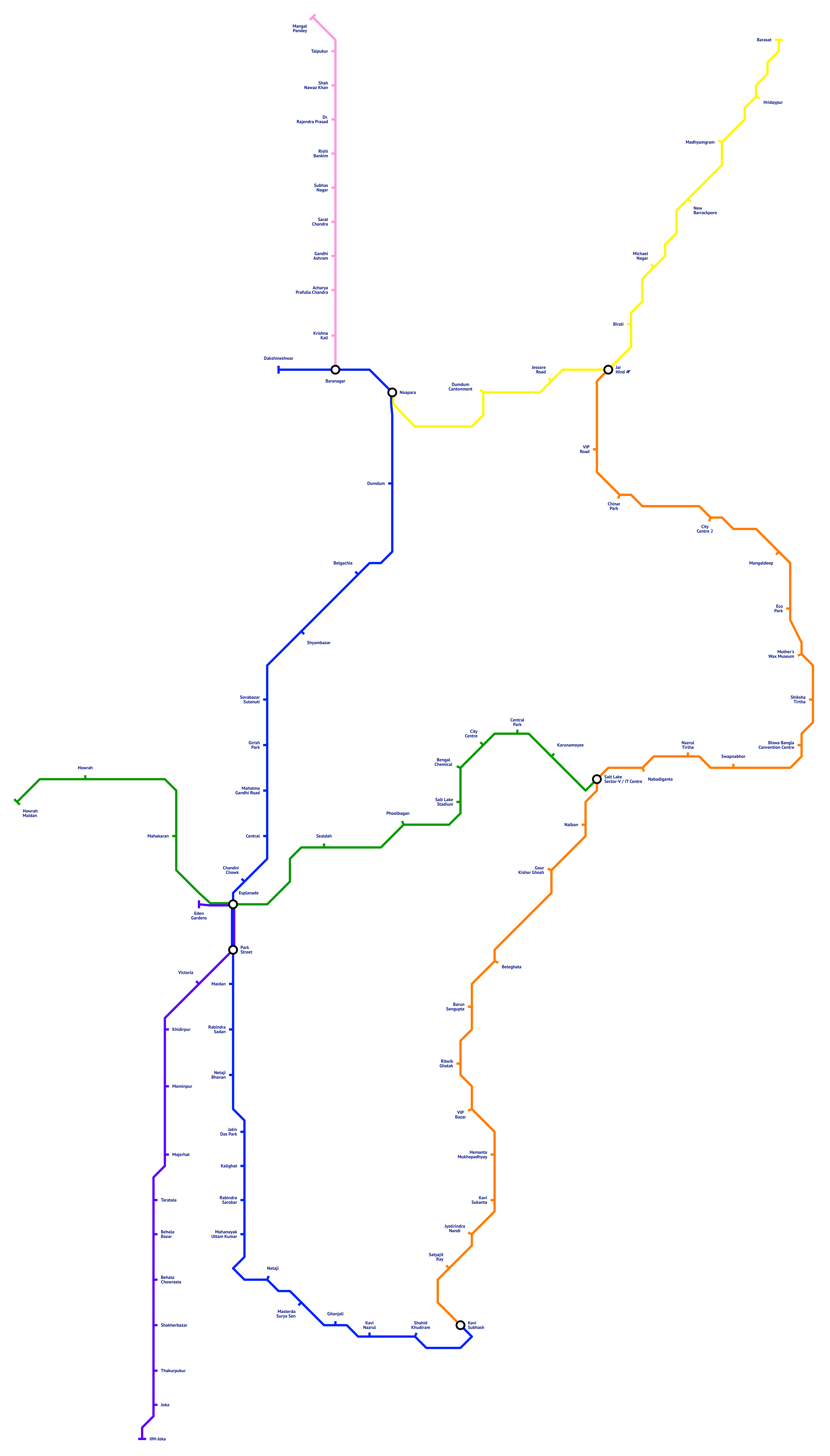

The Kolkata Metro is a rapid transit system serving the city of Kolkata and the Kolkata Metropolitan Region in West Bengal, India. Opened in 1984, it is the first rapid transit system in South Asia. It has 5 colour-coded lines with 55 operational stations with a total length of 73.42 km (45.62 mi), making it India's fourth largest and fourth busiest metro rail system. The system has a mix of underground, at-grade, and elevated stations using both broad-gauge and standard-gauge tracks. It operates on a 750 V DC Third rail system. Trains operate between 06:30 and 22:44 IST.

The Kolkata Metro was initially planned in the 1920s, but construction started in the 1970s. The first underground stretch, from Bhawanipore (now Netaji Bhawan) to Esplanade, opened in 1984. A truncated section of Green Line, or the East–West Corridor, from Salt Lake Sector V to Howrah Maidan, was opened in 2020. Purple Line, or the Joka–Eden Gardens Corridor (currently truncated in Majerhat), opened in 2022, Orange Line, from Kavi Subhash to Beleghata, opened in 2024. The Yellow Line, from Noapara to Jai Hind, opened in 2025.

As of 2025, the Kolkata metro has the deepest metro station and largest underground metro station in India. Howrah metro station of the Green Line is the deepest metro station in India with depth of 34 m (112 ft). Also at the time of inauguration, it was the largest metro station of India. In August 2025, Jai Hind metro station of the Yellow Line became the largest metro station in India, as well as one of the largest in Asia.

Metro Railway, Kolkata and Kolkata Metro Rail Corporation are the owners and operator of the system. On 29 December 2010, Metro Railway, Kolkata, became the 17th zone of the Indian Railways, completely owned and funded by the Ministry of Railways. It is the only metro system in the country to be controlled entirely by Indian Railways. Around 300 daily train trips carry more than 800,000 passengers.

== History ==
=== Early attempts ===
In the September 1919 session of the Imperial Legislative Council at Shimla, a committee was set up by W. E. Crum that recommended a metro line for Kolkata (formerly Calcutta). This line was supposed to connect Bagmari in the east to Benaras Road, Salkia, in Howrah in the west via a tunnel beneath Hooghly River. The estimated construction costs were £3,526,154, about ₹36.4 crore (equivalent to ₹77 billion or US$820 million in 2026) based on current exchange rates, and the proposed deadline was 1925–1926. The proposed line was 10.4 km (6.5 mi) long, about 4 km (2.5 mi) shorter than the current Green Line, which would connect East Bengal Railway in Bagmari and East Indian Railway in Benaras Road. The tickets were priced at 3 annas (₹ 0.1875) for the full trip. Crum also mentioned a north–south corridor back then. An east–west metro railway connection, named the "East–West Tube Railway", was proposed for Kolkata in 1921 by Harley Dalrymple-Hay. All the reports can be found in his 1921 book Calcutta Tube Railways. However, in 1923, the proposal was not undertaken due to a lack of funds.

=== Planning ===
Then the Chief Minister of West Bengal, Bidhan Chandra Roy, reconceived the idea of an underground railway for Kolkata from 1949 to 1950. A team of French experts conducted a survey, but nothing concrete materialised. Efforts to solve the traffic problem by augmenting the existing fleet of public transport vehicles hardly helped, since roads accounted for only 4.2 percent of the surface area in Kolkata, compared with 25 percent in Delhi and 30 percent in other cities. To find alternative solutions, the Metropolitan Transport Project (MTP) was set up in 1969. The MTP, with the help of Soviet specialists, Lenmetroproekt and East German engineers, prepared a master plan to provide five rapid-transit (metro) lines for the city of Kolkata, totaling a length of 97.5 km (60.6 mi), in 1971. Three were selected for construction:

- Dum Dum – Tollygunge (Blue Line. Presently operates from Dakshineswar to New Garia.)
- Bidhannagar – Ramrajatala (Green Line. Presently truncated till Howrah Maidan.)
- Dakshineswar – Thakurpukur (divided into Blue Line: Noapara to Dakshineswar and Purple Line: Joka to Eden Gardens)

The highest priority was given to the busy north–south corridor between Dum Dum and Tollygunge over a length of 16.45 km (10.22 mi); work on this project was approved on 1 June 1972. A tentative deadline was fixed to complete all the corridors by 1991. Though the idea of an underground railway in Calcutta was first explored during the British era and later envisioned by Dr. Bidhan Chandra Roy, the then Chief Minister of West Bengal, it was ultimately Shri Siddhartha Shankar Ray who transformed the dream into reality. Shri Siddhartha Shankar Ray was the driving force behind turning the Calcutta Metro from a decades-old plan into a living project. As Chief Minister of West Bengal, he revived the stalled project, ensured land acquisition, and persuaded the Central Government to release crucial funds. Under his leadership, the foundation stone of India's first underground railway was laid in 1972 by the then Prime Minister of India, Smt. Indira Gandhi. The Kolkata Metro, earlier known as ‘Patal Rail’, remains a lasting testament to his foresight, determination, and developmental legacy.

== Construction ==
=== North-South Metro ===
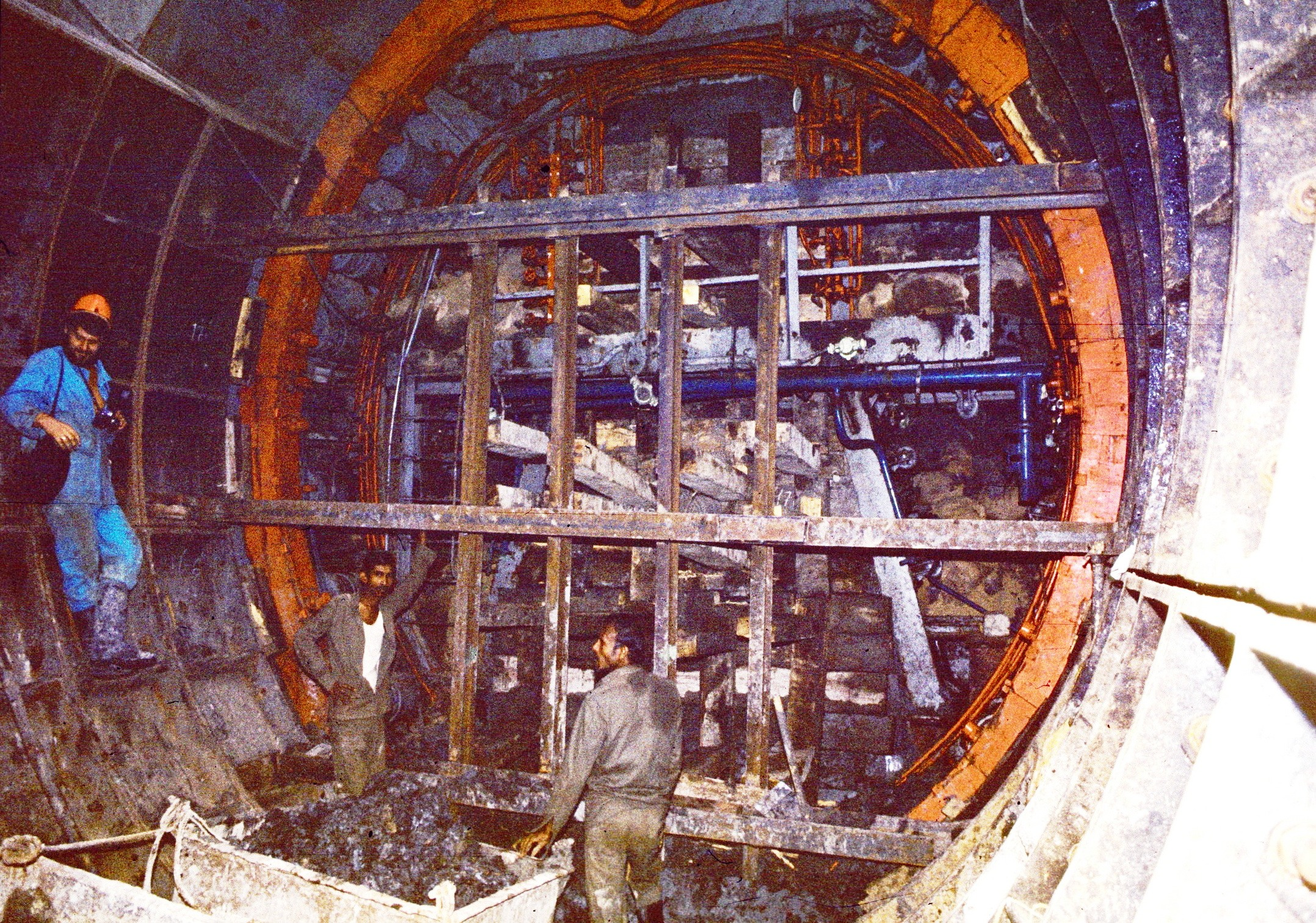
Shyambazar-Belgachhia Section (shield tunneling using compressed air and airlocks) using Hungarian expertise during its construction in the 1980s

Since it was India's first metro and was constructed as a completely indigenous process, a traditional cut-and-cover method and driven shield tunneling was chosen and the Kolkata Metro was more of a trial-and-error affair, in contrast to the Delhi Metro, which saw the involvement of multiple international consultants. As a result, it took nearly 23 years to completely construct the 17 km (11 mi) underground railway.

The foundation stone of the project was laid by Indira Gandhi, the Prime Minister of India, on 29 December 1972, and construction work started in 1973–74. Initially, cut and cover along with slurry wall construction to handle soft ground, was recommended by the Soviet Union consultants. Later, in 1977, it was decided to adopt both shield tunneling and cut and cover methods for the construction of underpopulated areas, sewer lines, water mains, electrical cables, telephone cables, tram lines, canals, etc. The technology was provided by M/s NIKEX Hungarian Co., Budapest. In the early days, the project was led by the Union Railway Minister from West Bengal, A. B. A. Ghani Khan Choudhury, often against the prevailing socio-political stance of his contemporaries in the West Bengal government. From the start of construction, the project had to contend with several problems including insufficient funds (until 1977–1978), a shifting of underground utilities, court injunctions, and an irregular supply of vital materials. In 1977, an injunction for the allocation of new funding was passed by the newly elected Jyoti Basu government.

Despite all the hurdles, services began on 24 October 1984, with the commissioning of a partial commercial service covering a distance of 3.40 km (2.11 mi) with five stations served between Esplanade and Bhowanipur (currently Netaji Bhavan). The first metro was driven by Tapan Kumar Nath and Sanjoy Kumar Sil. The service was quickly followed by commuter services on another 2.15 km (1.34 mi) stretch in the north between Dum Dum and Belgachhia on 12 November 1984. The commuter service was extended to Tollygunge on 29 April 1986, covering a further distance of 4.24 km (2.63 mi), making the service available over a distance of 9.79 km (6.08 mi) and covering 11 stations. However, the services on the north section were suspended starting 26 October 1992, as this small, isolated section was little used. The Blue Line was almost entirely built by cut and cover method, while a small 1.09 km stretch between Belgachia and Shyambazar was built using shield tunneling with compressed air and air locks, since the alignment crossed a railway yard (now Kolkata railway station) and Circular Canal.

Kolkata Metro evolution from 1984 to 2025

After more than eight years, the 1.62 km (1.01 mi) Belgachhia–Shyambazaar section, along with the Dum Dum–Belgachhia stretch, was opened on 13 August 1994. Another 0.71 km (0.44 mi) stretch from Esplanade to Chandni Chowk was commissioned shortly afterward, on 2 October 1994. The Shyambazaar-Shobhabazar–Girish Park (1.93 km [1.20 mi]) and Chandni Chowk–Central (0.60 km [0.37 mi]) sections were opened on 19 February 1995. Services on the entire stretch of the Metro were introduced from 27 September 1995 by bridging the 1.80 km (1.12 mi) gap with Mahatma Gandhi Road metro station in the middle.

In 1999–2000, the extension of Blue Line along an elevated corridor from Tollygunge to New Garia, with six stations, was sanctioned at a cost of ₹907 crore (equivalent to ₹43 billion or US$450 million in 2026). The section was constructed and opened in two phases, Mahanayak Uttam Kumar to Kavi Nazrul in 2009 and Kavi Nazrul to Kavi Subhash in 2010. In the north, the line was extended till Noapara from Dum Dum on 10 July 2013. The latest extension opened was the 4.1 km (2.5 mi) stretch from Noapara to Dakshineswar on 23 February 2021.

=== East-West Metro ===
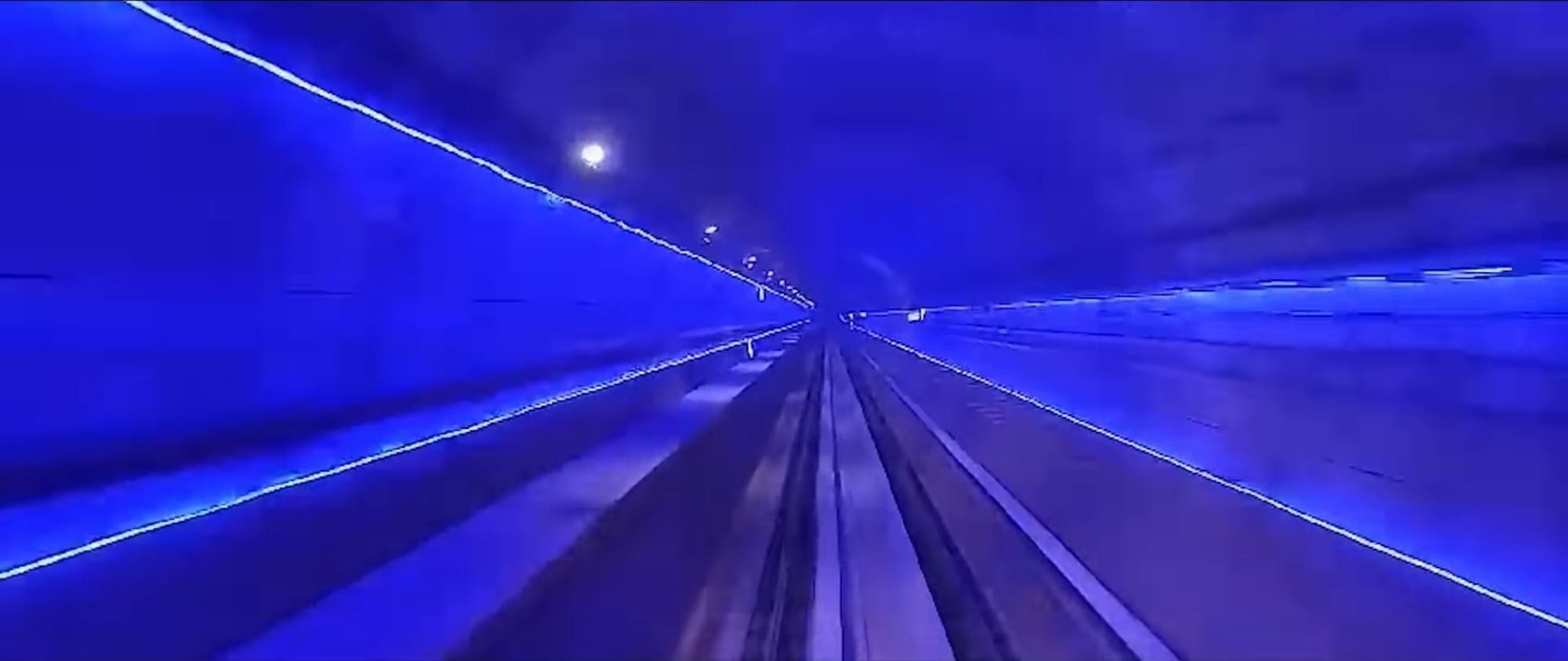
Hooghly River Underwater metro tunnel segment

The master plan of the metro corridor was made in 1971 along with the North–South Corridor, connecting the office district of Bidhannagar with the twin city and transportation hub Howrah via another transport hub of the city, Sealdah, and the central business district Esplanade by an underwater metro line. It is a ₹4,874.6 crore (equivalent to ₹150 billion or US$1.6 billion in 2026) project, sanctioned in 2008 by Prime Minister Manmohan Singh. The foundation stone was laid on 22 February 2009 and construction started in March 2009. The autonomous Kolkata Metro Rail Corporation (KMRC) was formed to implement the project. The Government of India (Ministry of Urban Development) and Government of West Bengal each had a half-share in it. Later, the Government of West Bengal pulled out from it, and the shares were transferred to the Ministry of Railways.

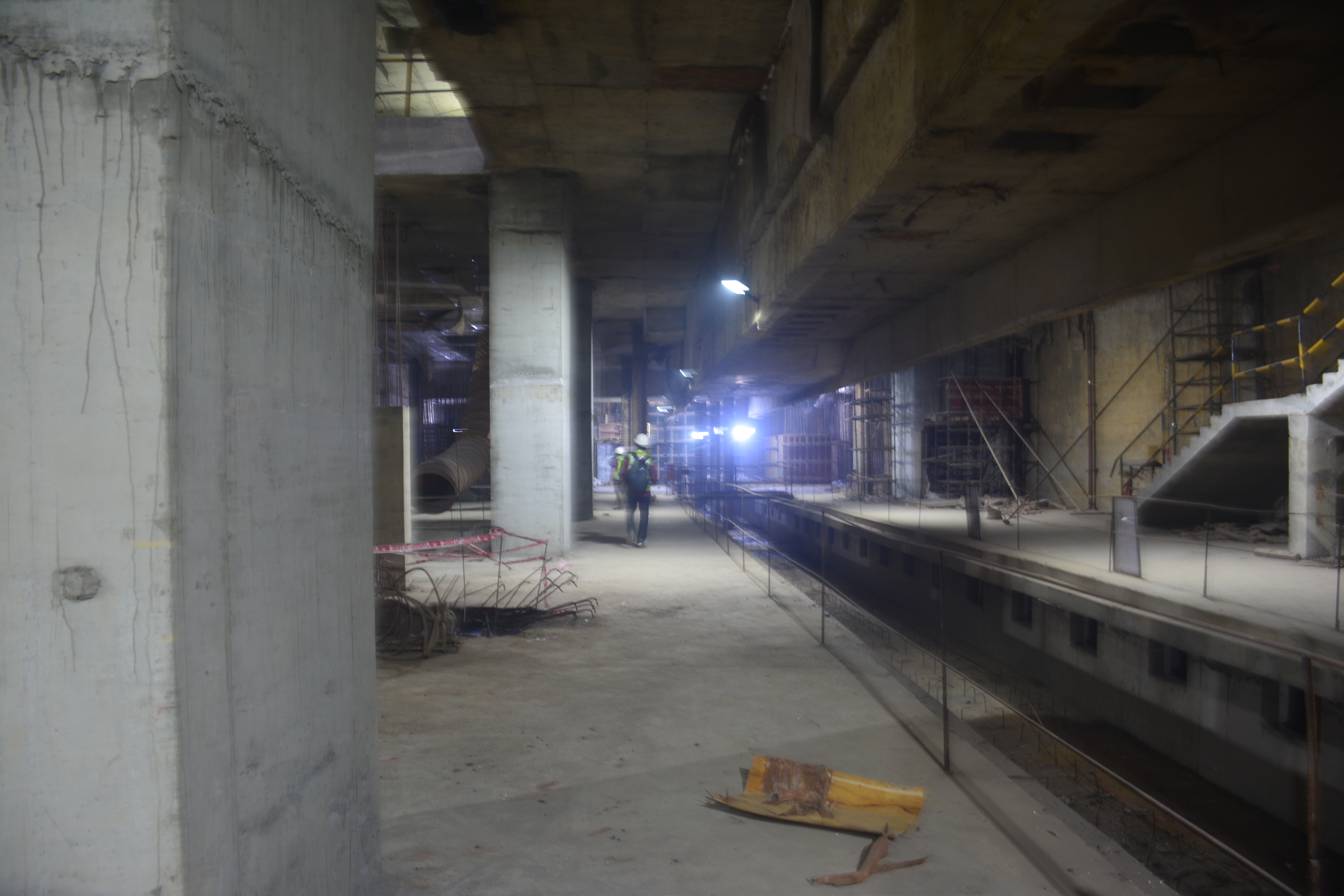
Construction of Howrah metro station, the deepest metro station in India. Currently, it is operational.

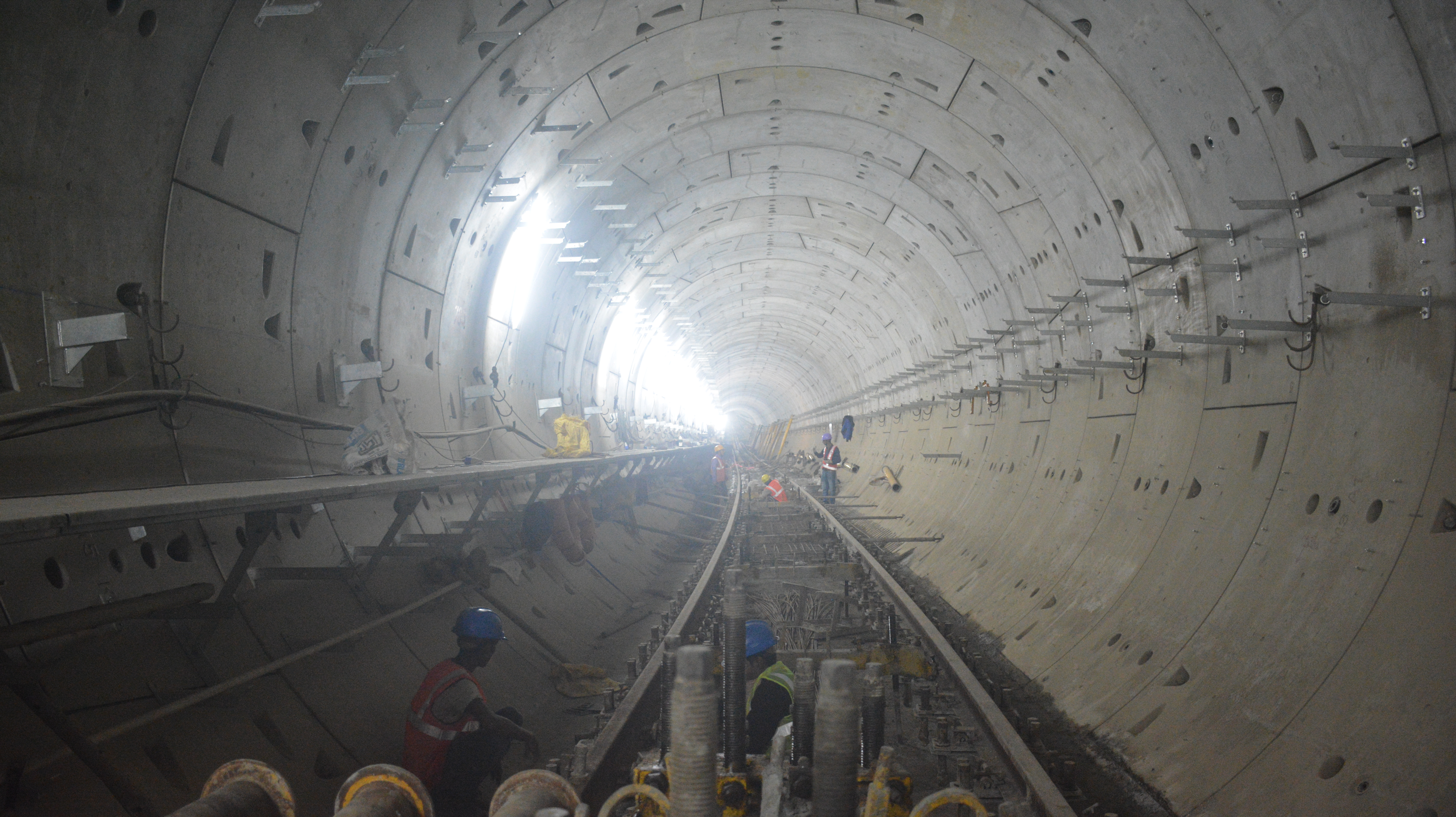
East West Metro Tunnel under the Hooghly River is the biggest underwater metro tunnel in India.

The realignment led to many other issues and delays. Some of the biggest issues were the H-piles under the Esplanade metro station and the Bowbazar mishap. Per the 1971 master plan, the East-West Corridor was supposed to pass under Central metro station, so the square foundational beams in Esplanade were not removed. Since the tunnel boring machines cannot cut through steel, another small tunnel was dug using New Austrian tunneling method (NATM) and the H-piles were cut manually. This extended the tunneling process by one and a half months. In September 2019, during the construction of the eastbound tunnel (from Esplanade to Sealdah), a machine hit an aquifer under Bowbazar, causing a major collapse in the area, delaying work in that section for several months. Around 80 houses were damaged and many buildings were declared unsafe, affecting more than 600 people. Later subsidence in the area was checked using grouting.

== Timeline ==
Operational
Line	Terminals		Stations	Length (km)	Opening Date
Blue Line	Esplanade	Netaji Bhavan	5	3.4	24 Oct 1984
Blue Line	Dum Dum	Belgachia	2	2.15	12 Nov 1984
Blue Line	Netaji Bhavan	Mahanayak Uttam Kumar	4	4.24	29 Apr 1986
Blue Line	Belgachia	Shyambazar	1	1.63	13 Aug 1994
Blue Line	Esplanade	Chandni Chowk	1	0.71	2 Oct 1994
Blue Line	Shyambazar	Girish Park	2	1.92	19 Feb 1995
Blue Line	Chandni Chowk	Central	1	0.6	19 Feb 1995
Blue Line	Girish Park	Central	1	1.8	27 Sep 1995
Blue Line	Kavi Nazrul	Mahanayak Uttam Kumar	4	5.83	22 Aug 2009
Blue Line	Kavi Nazrul	Kavi Subhash	2	2.85	8 Oct 2010
Blue Line	Dum Dum	Noapara	1	2.09	10 Jul 2013
Blue Line	Noapara	Dakshineswar	2	4.14	23 Feb 2021
Green Line	Salt Lake Stadium	Salt Lake Sector-V	6	4.88	13 Feb 2020
Green Line	Salt Lake Stadium	Phoolbagan	1	1.67	4 Oct 2020
Green Line	Phoolbagan	Sealdah	1	2.33	11 Jul 2022
Green Line	Howrah Maidan	Esplanade	4	4.8	15 Mar 2024
Green Line	Esplanade	Sealdah	0	2.45	22 August 2025
Purple Line	Taratala	Joka	6	6.5	30 Dec 2022
Purple Line	Taratala	Majerhat	1	1.25	6 March 2024
Yellow Line	Noapara	Jai Hind	4	7.04	22 August 2025
Orange Line	Kavi Subhash	Hemanta Mukhopadhyay	5	5.4	6 March 2024
Orange Line	Hemanta Mukhopadhyay	Beleghata	4	4.39	22 August 2025
Total			58	73.42	

Under construction
Line	Terminals		Stations	Length (km)	Tentative completion
Purple Line	Majerhat	Esplanade	5	6.5	2030
Yellow Line	Jai Hind	Michael Nagar	2	2.06	2030
Orange Line	Beleghata	IT Centre	3	4.5	November 2026
Orange Line	IT Centre	Jai Hind	12	15.47	2027
Total			22	28.53	

Approved (Note: This section contains all lines/line's segment which are sanctioned, land acquisition ongoing or tender had been floated.)
Line	Terminals		Stations	Length (km)
Green Line (Extension)	Salt Lake Sector-V	Teghoria	5	6.65
Purple Line	Esplanade	Eden Gardens	1	1.6
Purple Line	Joka	IIM-Joka	1	1.7
Purple Line (Branch)	IIM-Joka	Diamond Park	1	1.69
Yellow Line	Michael Nagar	Suripukur	4	7.6
Pink Line	Baranagar	Barrackpore	10	12.50
Total			22	31.74

Proposed (Note: This section contains all lines/line's segment which are not approved, but route, station and alignment had been finalised.)
Line	Terminals		Stations	Length (km)
Purple Line (Branch)	Mahanayak Uttam Kumar	Diamond Park	4	8.5
Green Line	Howrah Maidan	Santragachi	8	9.1
Yellow Line	Jai Hind	Habra via Barasat	TBD	10+22
Grey Line	Chitpur	Karunamoyee	TBD	8.8
Total			12	58.4

Total network (combined)
Line	Number of stations	Length (km)
Blue Line	26	32.13
Green Line	25	32.35
Purple Line	19	27.74
Yellow Line	14	21
Pink Line	10	12.50
Orange Line	24	29.87
Total	118 (Note: There are total 5 interchange stations counted with the number of lines they serve. If interchange stations are counted only once, the number comes down to 104 stations.)	155.59

=== Expansion planning ===
By 2011–2012, the Railway Ministry had announced plans for the construction of five new metro lines and an extension of the existing north–south corridor. These were:

- Salt Lake – Howrah Maidan (Green Line or East–West Metro Corridor)
- Joka – B.B.D. Bagh (Purple Line, to be extended till Eden Gardens)
- Noapara – Barasat (Yellow Line, via airport)
- Baranagar – Barrackpore (Pink Line)
- New Garia – Dum Dum Airport (Orange Line)

==== Major modification and interchanges ====
A new four-platform interchange station was constructed at Noapara and Kavi Subhash. This acts as an interchange station for the Blue Line with the Yellow Line and Orange Line respectively. After the opening of the Yellow Line, all four platforms are now operational, whereas, from 6 March 2024, all four platforms of Kavi Subhash were in operation, until 28 July 2025, when the Blue Line platforms were temporarily closed for reconstruction.

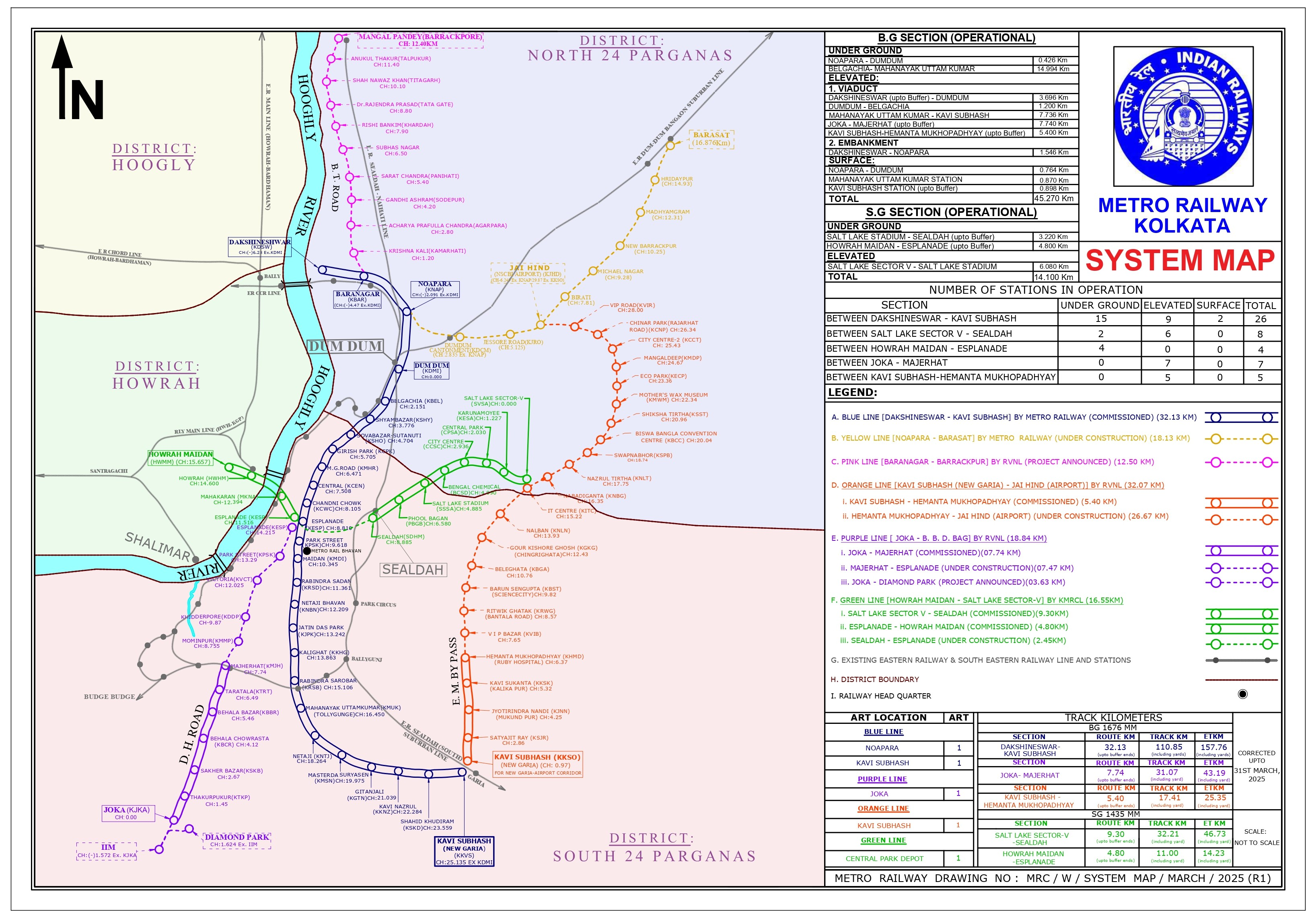
Kolkata metro system map published by Metro Railway, Kolkata on 31 March 2025

The existing Esplanade metro station was upgraded and a subway was constructed to the new metro station to provide an interchange among the Blue Line, Green Line and future Purple Line. Additional interchanges were built at Salt Lake Sector-V (green line)-IT Centre (orange line) and Jai Hind (Yellow line-Orange line) metro stations. In 2009–2010, the Blue Line underwent upgrades of services and amenities, and many stations were renamed after famous personalities by then Minister of Railways Mamata Banerjee.

Interchanges
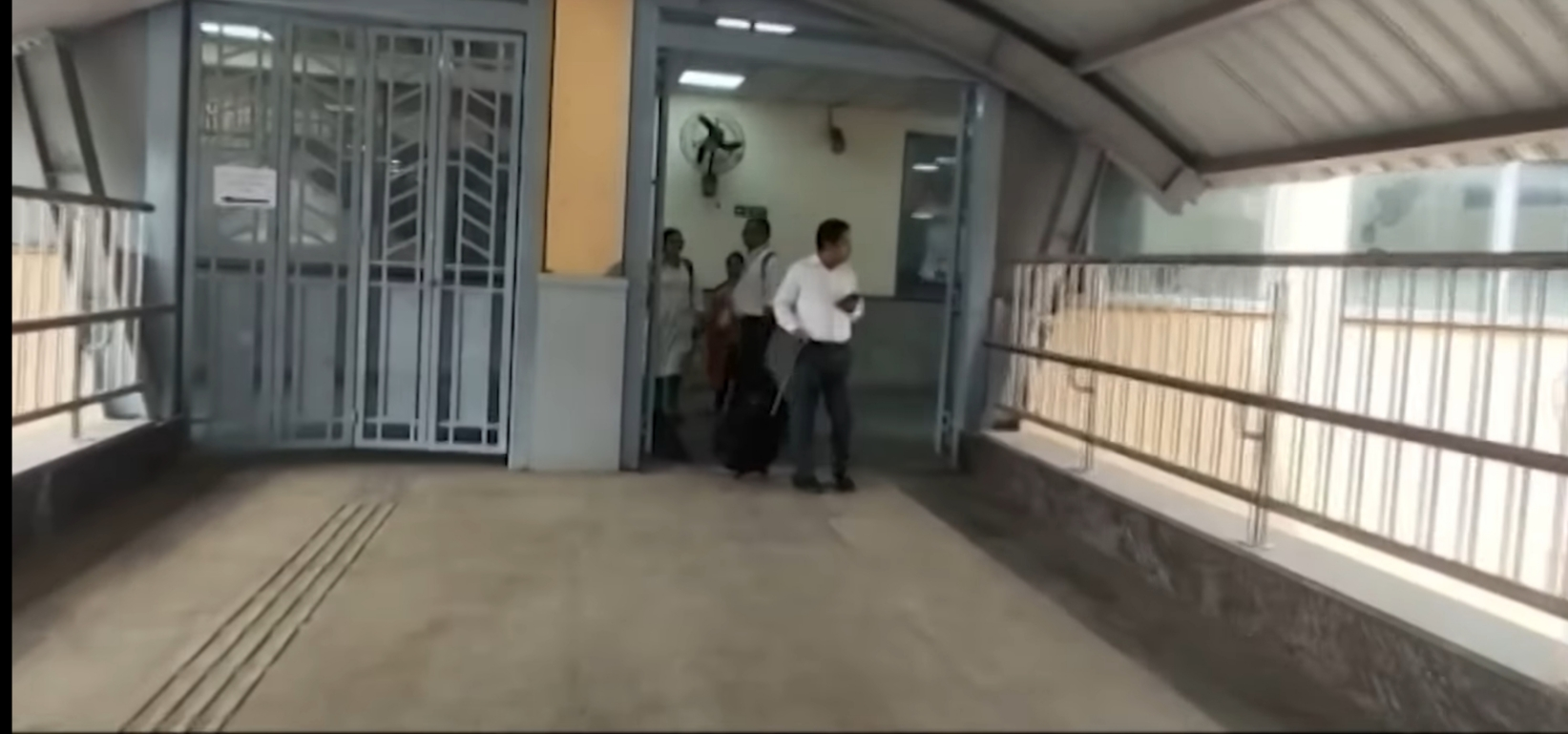
Salt Lake Sector-V (Green)-IT Centre (Orange)

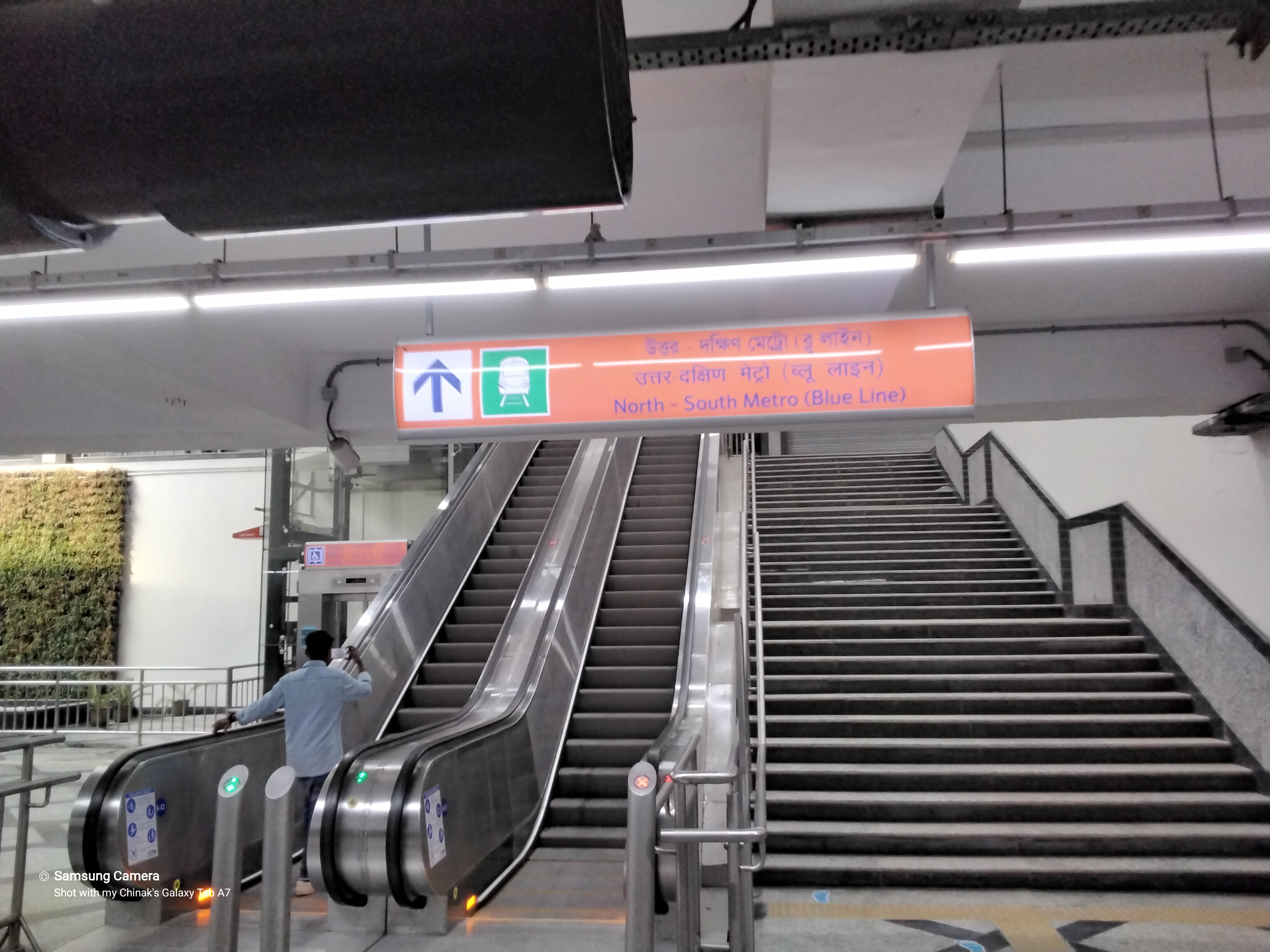
Kavi Subhash (Blue-Orange)

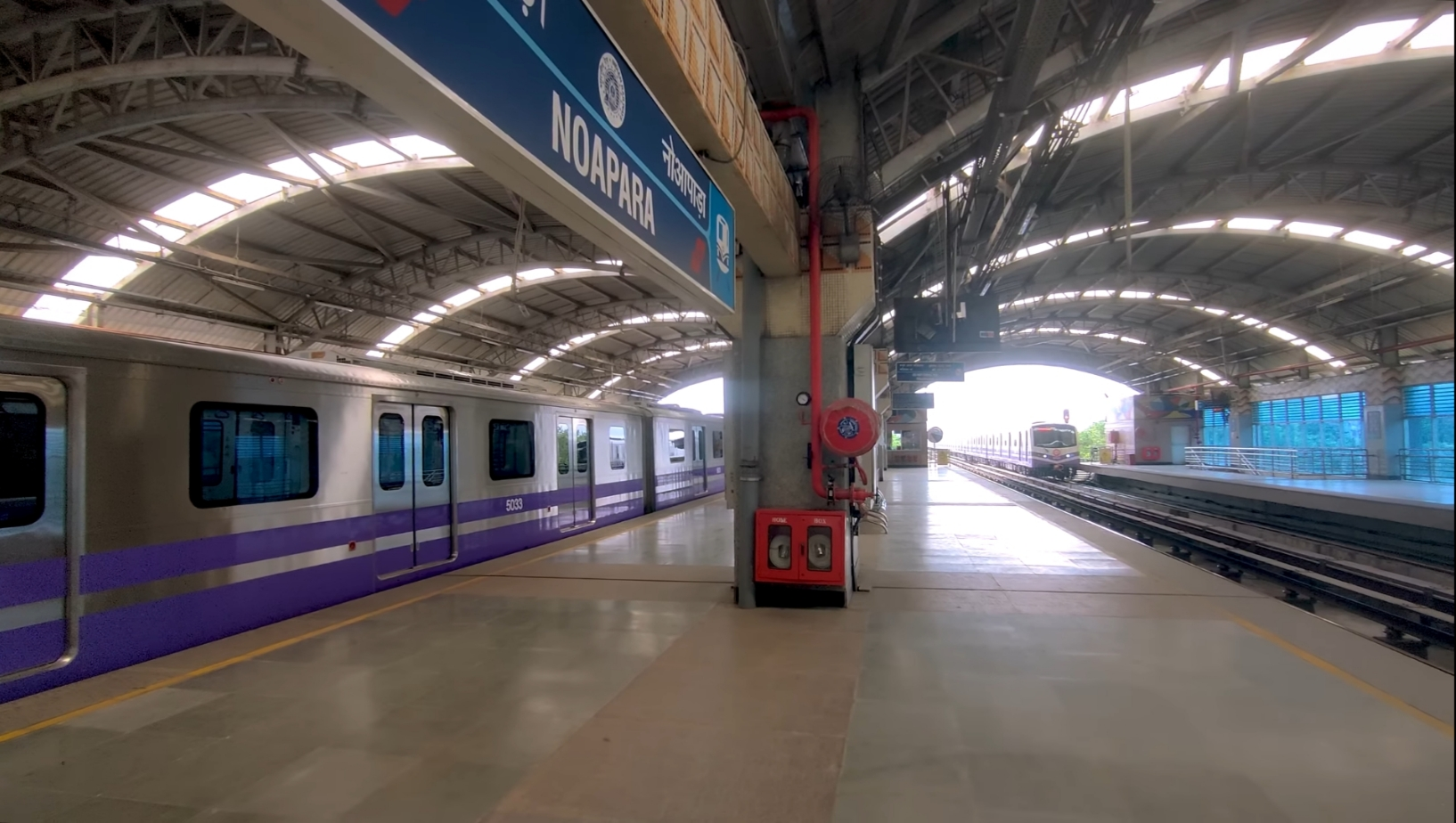
Noapara (Blue-Yellow)

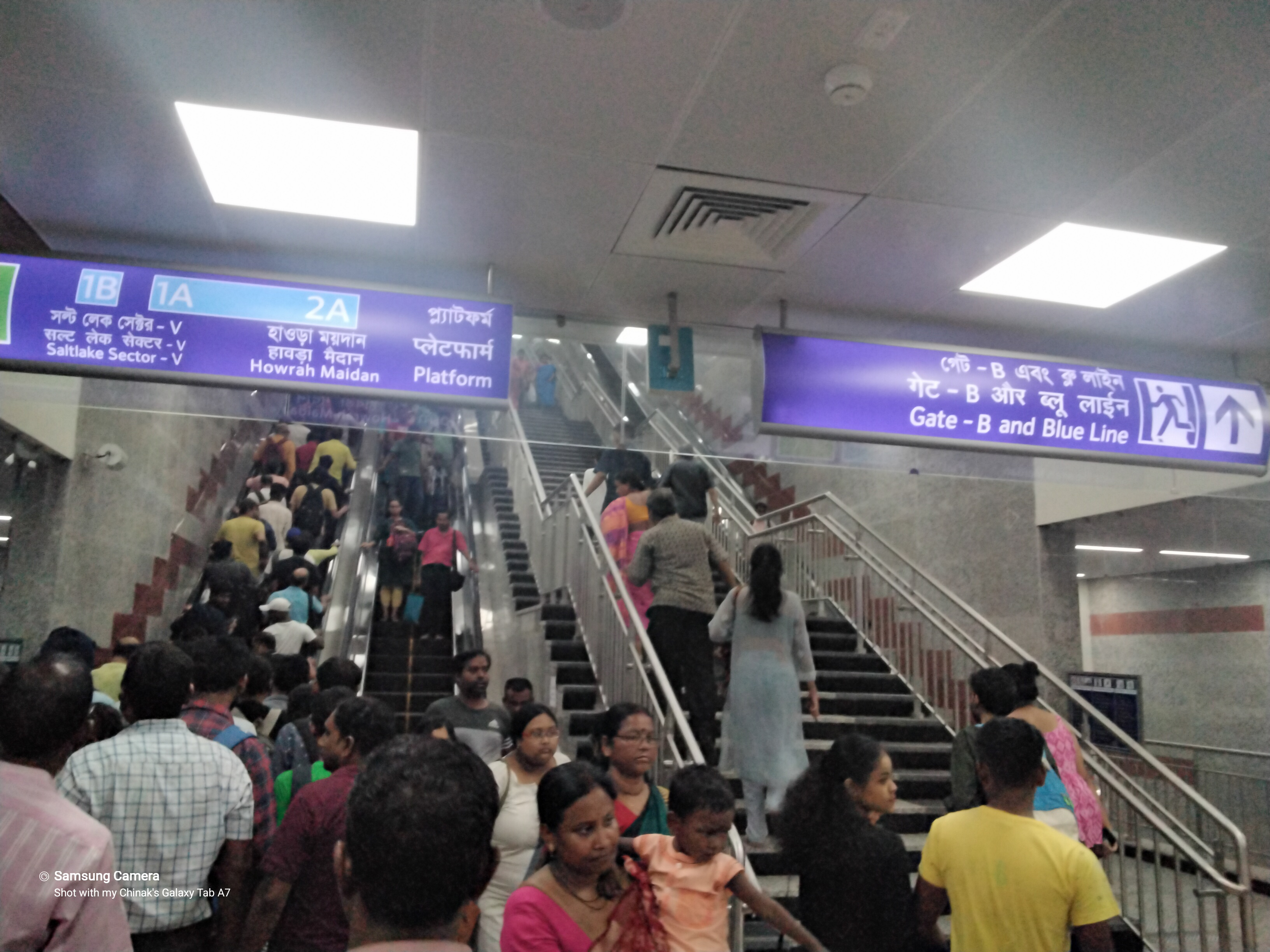
Esplanade (Blue-Green)

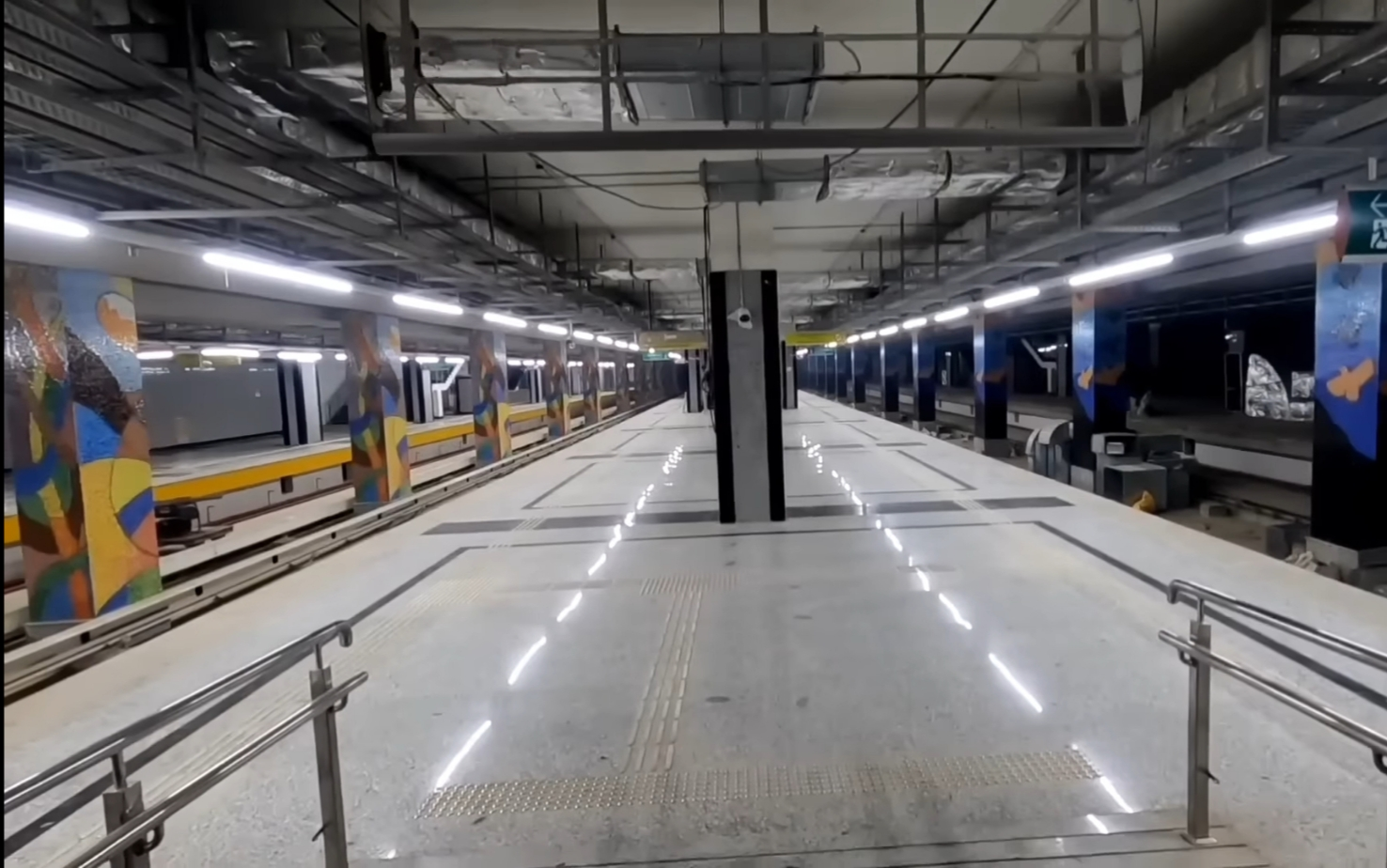
Jai Hind (Yellow-Orange)

== Proposed expansions ==
In 2012, RITES surveyed 16 new routes for connecting the suburban areas to the city. The key routes were:

1. Majerhat to Ruby via Kalighat and Ballygunge
2. Basirhat to Tollygunge
3. New Garia to Haroa via Bhangar
4. Joka to Mahanayak Uttam Kumar via Thakurpukur
5. New Garia to Canning via Baruipur along with EM Bypass
6. Joka to Diamond Harbour along Diamond Harbour Road (Purple Line extension)
7. Barasat to Barrackpore via SH-2 (Yellow Line extension)
8. Barrackpore to Kalyani via Kalyani Expressway (Yellow Line/ Pink Line extension)
9. Madhyamgram to Barrackpore via Sodepur Road and Kalyani Expressway
10. Branch line of Green Line from Karunamoyee to Kolkata station
11. Howrah Maidan – Shalimar – Santragachi (Green Line extension)
12. Santragachi to Dhulagarh (Green Line extension)
13. Howrah Maidan to Dankuni via Ichapur Road and Benaras Road
14. Howrah Maidan to Srirampore and Chandannagar via Dankuni, National Highway 2
15. Howrah Maidan to Belur
16. Botanic Garden to Bally via Howrah and Belur
17. Teghoria to Jai Hind (Green Line extension)

== Lines ==
=== Blue Line ===
Kolkata Metro Blue Line route map

Blue Line has a total length of 32.13 kilometres (19.96 mi) serving 26 Kolkata Metro stations, of which 15 are underground, nine are elevated and two at-grade. It uses the 5 ft 6 in (1,676 mm) broad gauge tracks. It was the first underground railway to be built in India, with the first trains running in October 1984 and the full stretch that had been initially planned completed and operational by February 1995. The southward extension of the Blue Line to an elevated corridor from Tollygunge to New Garia was constructed and opened in two phases, Mahanayak Uttam Kumar to Kavi Nazrul in 2009 and Kavi Nazrul to Kavi Subhash in 2010. Another extension constructed was the 2.59 km (1.61 mi) elevated corridor from Dum Dum to Noapara in 2013. The last 4.13 km (2.57 mi) extension from Noapara to Dakshineswar opened in 2021, thus completing the Blue line.

A northward extension from Dum Dum to Dakshineswar (6.20 km [3.85 mi]) was sanctioned and included in the 2010–2011 budget at a cost of ₹227.53 crore (equivalent to ₹557 crore or US$60 million in 2026). The commercial operations for Dum Dum to Noapara (2.09 km [1.30 mi]) were commissioned in March 2013, and construction from Noapara to Dakshineswar with an interchange with Pink Line at Baranagar (2.38 km [1.48 mi]) is being executed by RVNL. This section is opened on 23 February 2021 for general public.

An upgrade of the existing signalling system from Indian Railways signalling to Communication-Based Train Control (CBTC) was proposed by Metro Railway, Kolkata, at a cost of ₹467 crore (equivalent to ₹600 crore or US$64 million in 2026), and was subsequently approved by Indian Railways. As part of the line's modernization, the underground section's stainless-steel third rail was replaced with a high-conductivity aluminium third rail, with the upgrade completed in May 2026. The upgrade reduced energy losses by about 84% and mitigated voltage drops. It is expected to support the future implementation of CBTC, enabling train headways to be reduced from five minutes to as little as 90 seconds, while also lowering carbon emissions over the system's operational lifetime.

On July 28, 2025, cracks were detected in the last four columns of the Line-1 Up platform at Kavi Subhash station. So, the Line-1 platforms of the station were closed to passengers as a safety measure and the trains are being terminated Shahid Khudiram station. However, the empty rakes would continue to run up to the station for reversal and maintenance at its depot. On investigation, it was found that the damage on the columns supporting the platforms were weakened beyond repair. So, Metro Authorities decided to raze the entire Line-1 complex of the station (keeping the tracks intact) and rebuild it. E-tenders were floated and the work is expected to be completed within ten months.

=== Green Line ===
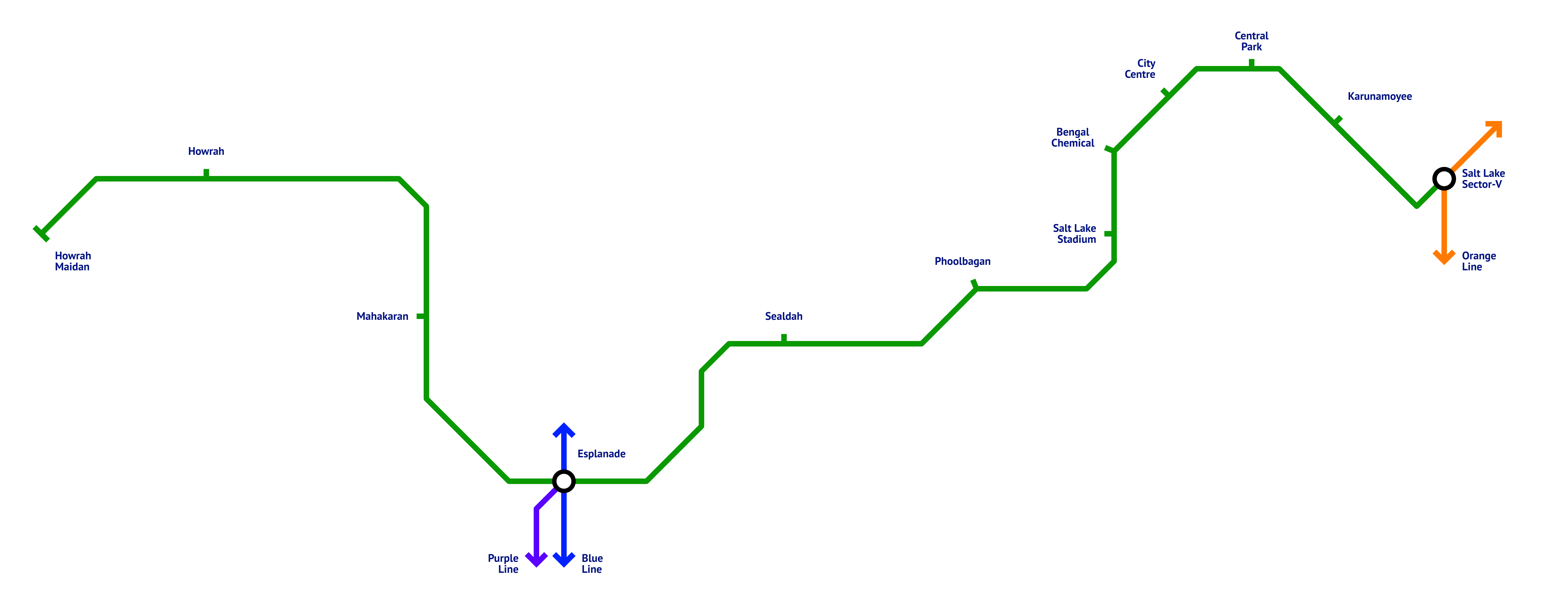
Kolkata Metro Green Line route map

Green Line, is the metro corridor to connect Kolkata with Howrah by an underwater tunnel below the Hooghly River. The length was supposed to be 14.67 km (9.12 mi), 8.9 km (5.5 mi) underground and 5.77 km (3.59 mi) elevated. However, the project was stalled several times due to land acquisition and slum relocation issues. A major route realignment in 2013 increased the length to 16.55 km (10.28 mi). The elevated stretch is 5.77 km (3.59 mi) long while the underground stretch is 10.81 km (6.72 mi). The planned intersection with the Blue Line at Central was re-aligned to Esplanade (interchanges with Blue Line and Purple Line). In September 2019, during the construction of the eastbound tunnel between Sealdah metro station and Esplanade metro station, a tunnel boring machine hit an aquifer at Bowbazar, causing a major collapse in the area, delaying work on that section for several months. These issues have caused massive delays to the project, and foreign currency losses had led to an 80 percent cost escalation of the project to nearly ₹8,996.96 crore (equivalent to ₹140 billion or US$1.5 billion in 2026).

Between Mahakaran and Howrah, the metro runs under the Hooghly River– the biggest and the only underwater metro tunnel in India. Transfer stations with railways are located at two major railway stations, Sealdah and Howrah. A new elevated extension from Sector-V to Teghoria was sanctioned a distance of 5.5 km (3.4 mi) at a budget of ₹674 crore (equivalent to ₹11 billion or US$110 million in 2026) in 2016. From Teghoria, passengers can take the Orange Line metro.

The line from Sector-V to Salt Lake Stadium was inaugurated on 13 February 2020 by the then Minister of Railways Piyush Goyal after 11 years of construction. Services were extended on 4 October 2020 to Phoolbagan metro station, the first underground station of the line. The extension added 1.66 km (1.03 mi) to the existing line. On July 11, 2022, this line was extended till Sealdah. On 6 March 2024, the Esplanade - Howrah Maidan section was inaugurated by Prime Minister Narendra Modi, leaving only 2.9 km between the two functional stations to be joined.

On 13 January 2025, the remaining 2.9 km between the two functional stations, Esplanade and Sealdah were successfully connected; but the separate signalling systems for the two operating parts of the line had not been unified. With the whole connection open for traffic, the travel time between the two railway stations was brought down to just 11 minutes. The remaining Sealdah–Esplanade stretch opened on 22 August 2025.

=== Purple Line ===
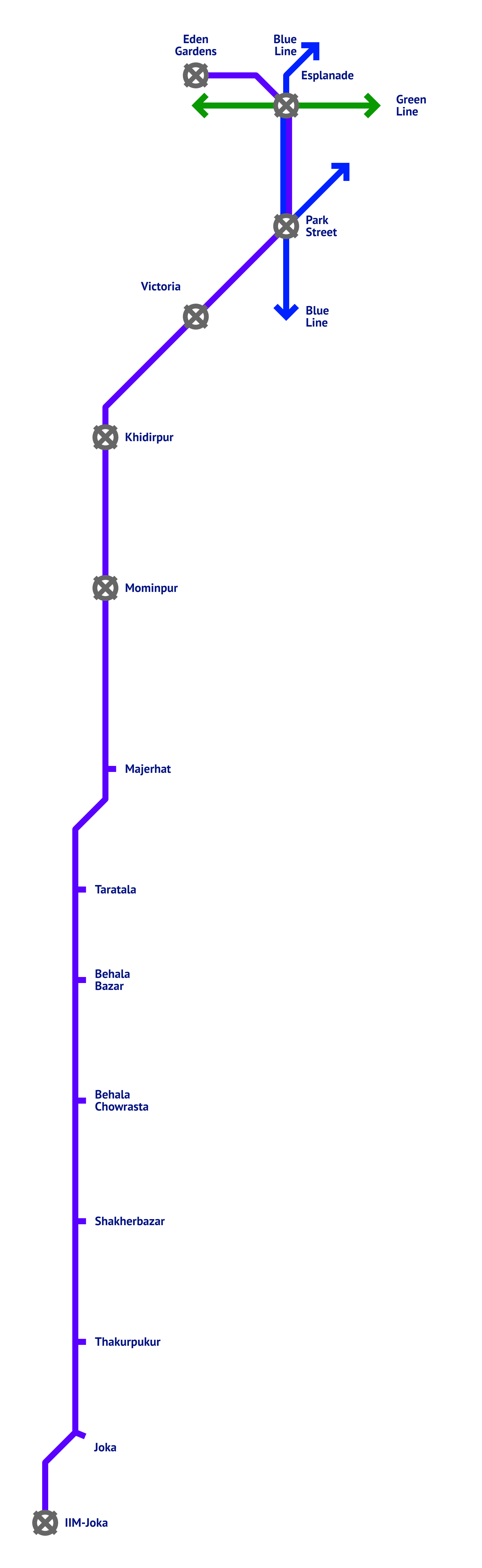
Kolkata Metro Purple Line route map

Previously, the stretch from Thakurpukur to Majerhat was surveyed as a branch line of the circular railway, and a metro line from Majerhat to Dakshineswar via Sealdah (interchange with Green Line) was planned. This plan was scrapped and a new metro line from further south in Joka to BBD Bagh was sanctioned in 2010–2011 with a total length of 17.22 km (10.70 mi) at an anticipated cost of ₹2,619.02 crore (equivalent to ₹64 billion or US$680 million in 2026). Later the route was truncated to Esplanade. The corridor runs along Diamond Harbour Road, Khidirpur Road, and Jawaharlal Nehru Road, major arterial roads of Kolkata, and has passenger interchange facilities with the Blue Line and Green line at Esplanade and Blue line at Park street. The proposed Esplanade station will not be the same as that of the Blue Line and Green Line but a different station that will be built at B.C. Roy market ground. The line now has a new depot in Joka. Due to land acquisition problems and objections from the Ministry of Defence, construction has been delayed several times since the beginning. Defence Ministry objected that the elevated corridor would overlook the Eastern Command headquarters at Fort William, Ordinance Depot at Mominpore. The change in alignment from elevated to underground increased the construction cost of the stretch to ₹3,000 crore (equivalent to ₹39 billion or US$410 million in 2026). The work resumed in several phases and new bids were invited by Rail Vikas Nigam Limited (RVNL) in April 2020. It is India's first metro line to run on indigenous head hardened rails, manufactured by Jindal Steel & Power. The extension of this line to IIM and Diamond Park for 2 km (1.2 mi) was sanctioned in the 2012–2013 Budget at a cost of ₹294.49 crore (equivalent to ₹606 crore or US$65 million in 2026). The work is being executed by RVNL.

The line has three phases:

- Joka to Majerhat (Phase 1; operational)
- Majerhat to Eden Gardens (Phase 2; under construction)
- Joka to Diamond Park (Phase 3; planned)

The Mominpur metro station was planned to be built across a 2500 sq. m area. However, the Ministry of Defence objected to the elevated structure, saying that it would overlook the Ordnance depot. This forced RVNL to stall the entire project, and RVNL almost dropped the station from the plan even though it alone would have a projected 20,000 passengers during peak hours. Underground Mominpur station was also not possible due to the sharp gradient from Taratala metro station. After a series of discussions and consultations with the Ministry of Defence and Government of West Bengal in 2016, it was decided to shift the station around 1 km (0.62 mi) northward, near the Alipore Bodyguard Lines. But, after a year Defence Ministry approved the Mominpur metro station in its original location as the change in alignment would have delayed the project and budget overrun. It will be the last elevated station of the corridor. Now, the proposed underground Khidirpur metro station is planned at the Alipore Bodyguard Lines. There were also hurdles regarding clearance for tunneling under defence lands. In 2020, the Defence Ministry eased out the process as lease rent wasn't required any more for tunneling as long the overground ownership of the land did not change. On 30 December 2022 the Joka - Taratala section and on 6 March 2024, the Taratala - Majerhat section was inaugurated remotely by Honourable Prime Minister Narendra Modi, completing the 7.75 km Phase 1 stretch. On 12 January 2025, it was reported that Metro authorities decided to extend the line to Eden Gardens instead of Esplanade to facilitate commuters and connect Strand Road, BBD Bag and Calcutta High Court. Subsequently, in March 2025 railways sanctioned ₹1,000 crore (equivalent to ₹21 billion or US$220 million in 2026) for the extension.

As of 2025, the estimated cost for the Joka-Esplanade section had risen to ₹10,360 crore (equivalent to ₹110 billion or US$1.1 billion in 2026).

=== Yellow Line ===
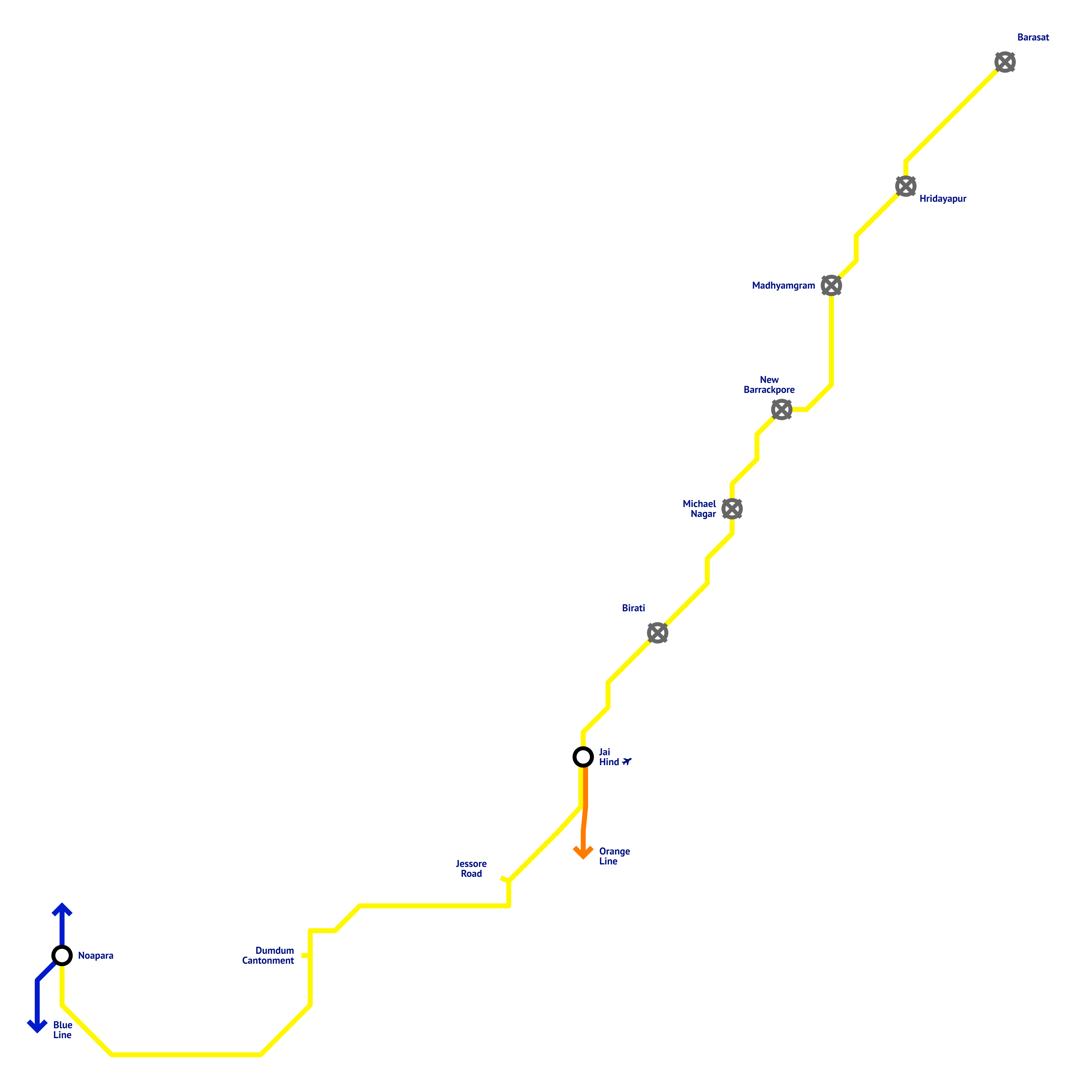
Kolkata Metro Yellow Line route map

The work of integrating the Circular Railway from Dum Dum Cantonment to Biman Bandar into a 6.249 km (3.883 mi) new metro line from Noapara to Netaji Subhash Chandra Bose International Airport was sanctioned in the 2010–2011 budget. The cost of the project is ₹184.83 crore (equivalent to ₹452 crore or US$48 million in 2026). An eastward extension from Biman Bandar to Barasat over 10.627 km (6.603 mi) was also sanctioned and included in the 2010–2011 budget. The cost of the project is ₹2,397.72 crore (equivalent to ₹54 billion or US$580 million in 2026). The work on this project from Noapara to Barasat is being executed by Metro Railway, Kolkata. Due to multiple delays and hurdles, the total cost of the project had grown to ₹4,829.57 crore (equivalent to ₹71 billion or US$750 million in 2026).

Following an objection from the Airports Authority of India (AAI), the route was further reworked. Instead of using the Circular Line's Jessore Road and Biman Bandar railway station, Jessore Road and Jai Hind metro station were planned at-grade and underground, respectively. This stretch will continue underground till Barasat after Prime Minister Narendra Modi's approval which was till New Barrackpore earlier. As of 2024, the construction work has started from the airport to New Barrackpore underground link, and the bidding for the New Barrackpore to Barasat line extension is expected to start.

The first phase of work from Noapara to Jai Hind opened on 22 August 2025.

=== Pink Line ===
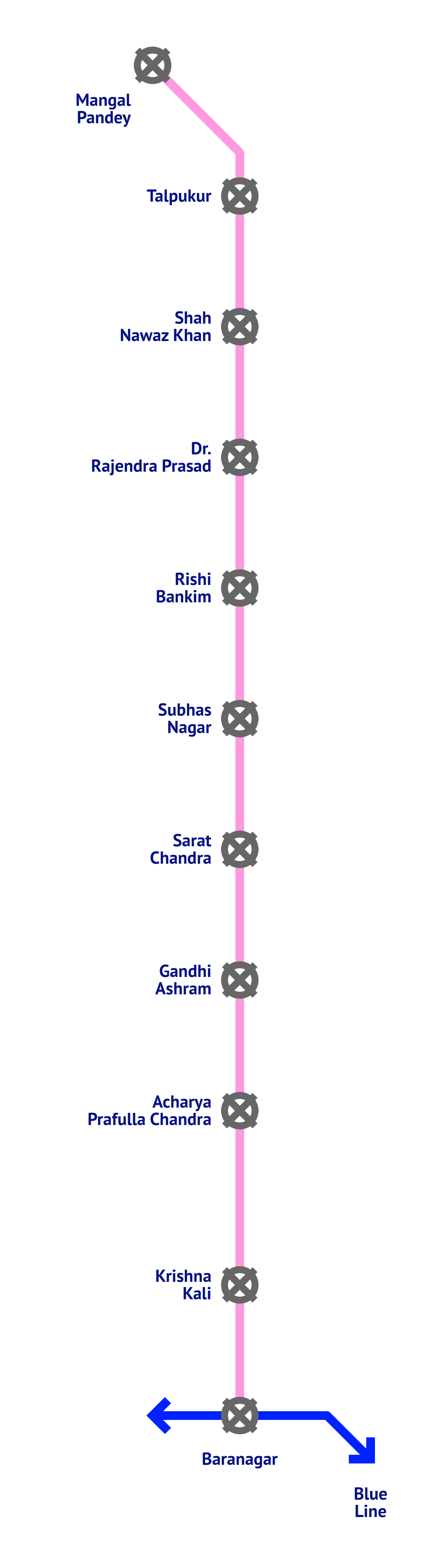
Kolkata Metro Pink Line route map

The Pink Line is the northward extension from Baranagar to Barrackpore [12.45 km (7.74 mi)]. It was sanctioned at a cost of ₹2,069.6 crore (equivalent to ₹51 billion or US$540 million in 2026) in the 2010–2011 budget. This line was meant to enable a quick commute from the northernmost suburbs to South Kolkata. The work corridor is being executed by RVNL. As of June 2026, no physical construction has commenced, and the project has been stalled as metro construction would affect the water pipelines along Barrackpore Trunk Road. To avoid this, another proposal was made to continue this line through the Kalyani Expressway. Eleven metro stations were planned on this route.

Recently Kolkata Municipal Corporation had given a NOC for the closure of a 48-inch water transmission line along the BT road and relocation of the underground pipeline for the contruction of the Metro Line.

Similarly RVNL had also floated a tender for the metro line, with a tender closing date of 26 September 2026 for the construction of 10 metro stations and viaduct.

=== Orange Line ===
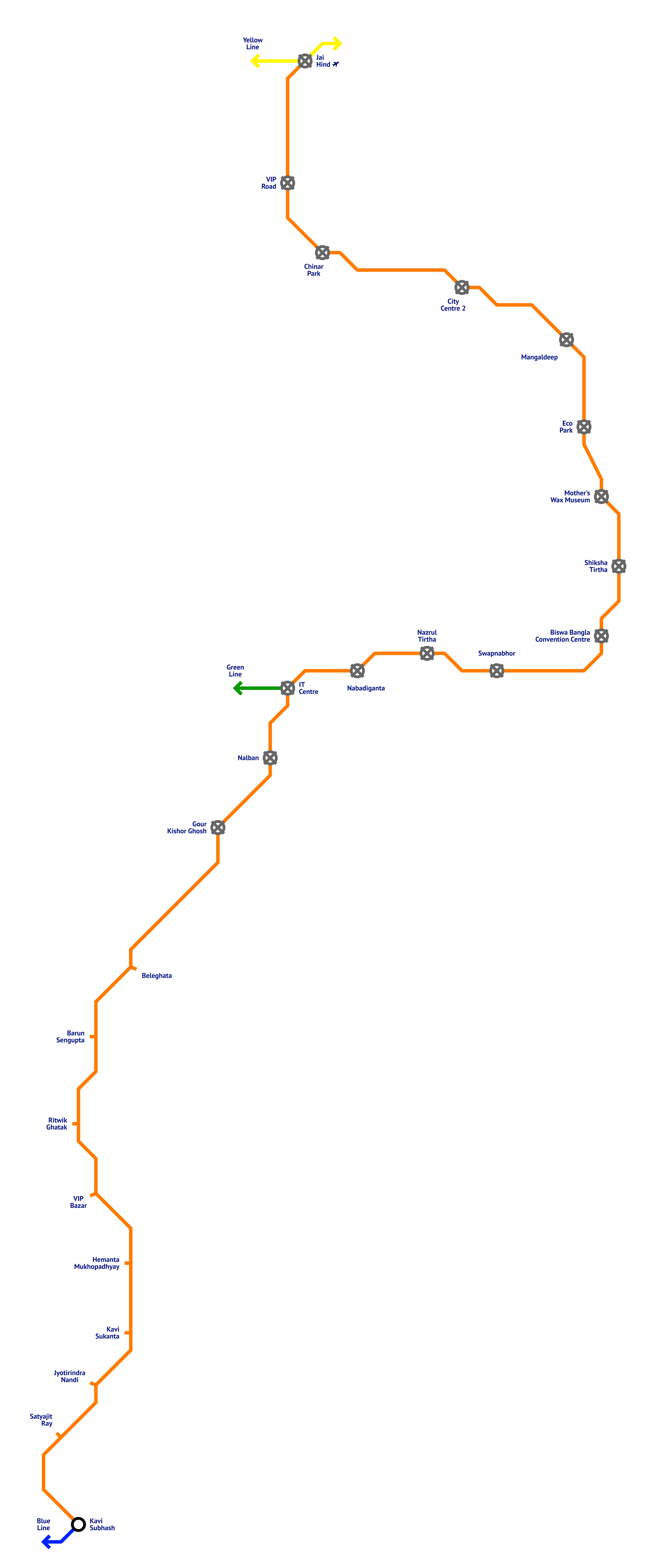
Kolkata Metro Orange Line route map

A connection between New Garia and Netaji Subhas Chandra Bose International Airport (29.87 km [18.56 mi]) via EM Bypass, Salt Lake and Rajarhat-New Town was sanctioned to reduce travel time between the southern fringes of Kolkata and the airport. Work on this line was inaugurated by the then Railway Minister Mamata Banerjee on 7 February 2011 with a project deadline of six years. The link between Kavi Subhash and Jai Hind, to be set up at a cost of ₹4,259.50 crore (equivalent to ₹55 billion or US$580 million in 2026), will have 24 stations with the terminal Jai Hind metro station being an underground one. The work is executed by Rail Vikas Nigam Limited. Jai Hind metro station will also have a stabling yard, and will be the largest underground facility in the country. This line will have interchanges at Kavi Subhash (with Blue line); Salt Lake Sector V (with Green line) and Teghoria/VIP Road (again with Green line). In July 2020, bids were invited by RVNL to complete the sections left due to various reasons and hurdles.

Initially, the Jai Hind metro station was planned to be elevated. However, the AAI objected that the elevated stretch up to the airport might pose a threat to aircraft, so the route was further reworked and the station was shifted underground, 150 m from the Airport terminal building. As per another revised plan, this line will continue till Barasat and the Yellow line would terminate at Jai Hind. There are also possibilities that Jai Hind metro station would serve as a junction of three lines, i.e. Noapara–Jai Hind, Kavi Subhash–Jai Hind, and Jai Hind–Barasat.

On 6 March 2024, the Kavi Subhash-Hemanta Mukhopadhyay was inaugurated while the Hemanta Mukhopadhyay-Beleghata section was inaugurated on 22 August 2025, completing the 5.4 km Phase 1 and 4.1 km Phase 2A stretches respectively.

== Network ==
Kolkata Metro
Line	First Operation	Last Extension	Stations	Length	Terminals		Rolling stock	Track gauge (mm)	Headway (min)
Blue Line	24 October 1984	22 February 2021	26	32.13	Dakshineswar	Kavi Subhash (currently till Shahid Khudiram as Kavi Subhash is closed due to renovation)	ICF, CRRC Dalian	1,676 mm (5 ft 6 in)	6 – 15
Green Line	13 February 2020	22 August 2025	12	16.6	Howrah Maidan	Salt Lake Sector-V	BEML	1,435 mm (4 ft 8 1/2 in)	8 – 15
Purple Line	30 December 2022	6 March 2024	7	7.75	Majerhat	Joka	ICF	1,676 mm (5 ft 6 in)	21
Yellow Line	22 August 2025		4	7.04	Noapara	Jai Hind	ICF, CRRC Dalian	1,676 mm (5 ft 6 in)	12 – 20
Orange Line	6 March 2024	22 August 2025	9	9.9	Kavi Subhash	Beleghata	ICF	1,676 mm (5 ft 6 in)	25
Total			55	73.42 km (45.62 mi)					

== Owners and operators ==
Since the formation of the Metropolitan Transport Project (MTP) in 1969, Kolkata Metro has always been under the Indian Railways, directly or indirectly. It is the only metro in the country to be controlled by Indian Railways. On 29 December 2010, Metro Railway, Kolkata, became the 17th zone of the Indian Railways, completely owned and funded by the Ministry of Railways. Although Kolkata Metro Rail Corporation was formed with 50-50 shares of the Government of West Bengal and the Government of India, as the implementing agency of the East–West Corridor, later majority shares were transferred to Indian Railways. In July 2019, the operation of Green line was handed over to Metro Railway, Kolkata.

Operator	Owner	Line(s)
Metro Railway, Kolkata	Ministry of Railways (India)	Blue Line, Purple line, Orange Line, Yellow Line
Kolkata Metro Rail Corporation	Ministry of Railways (India)	Green Line

== Services ==
=== Operations ===
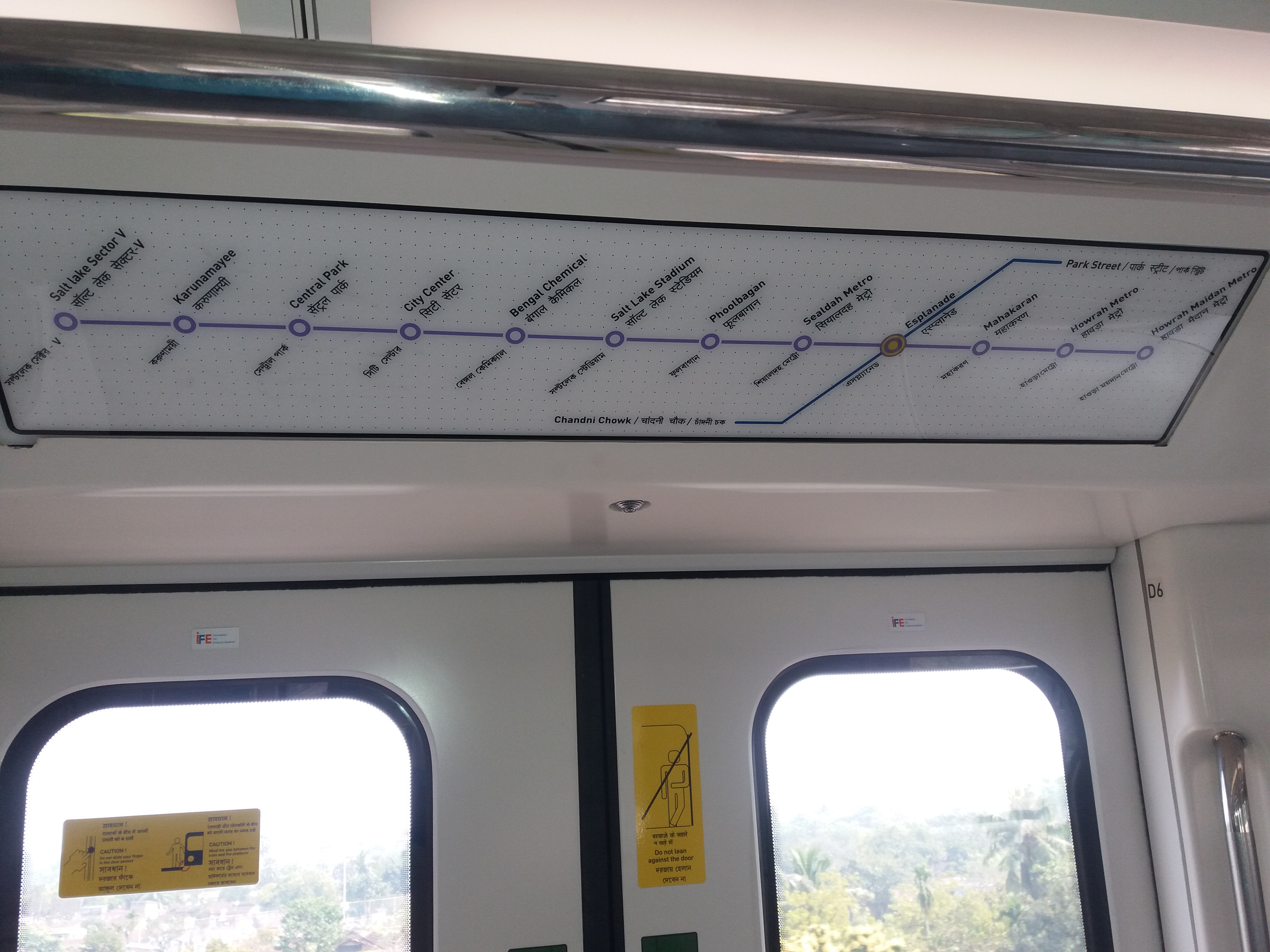
Map showing the whole route of green line

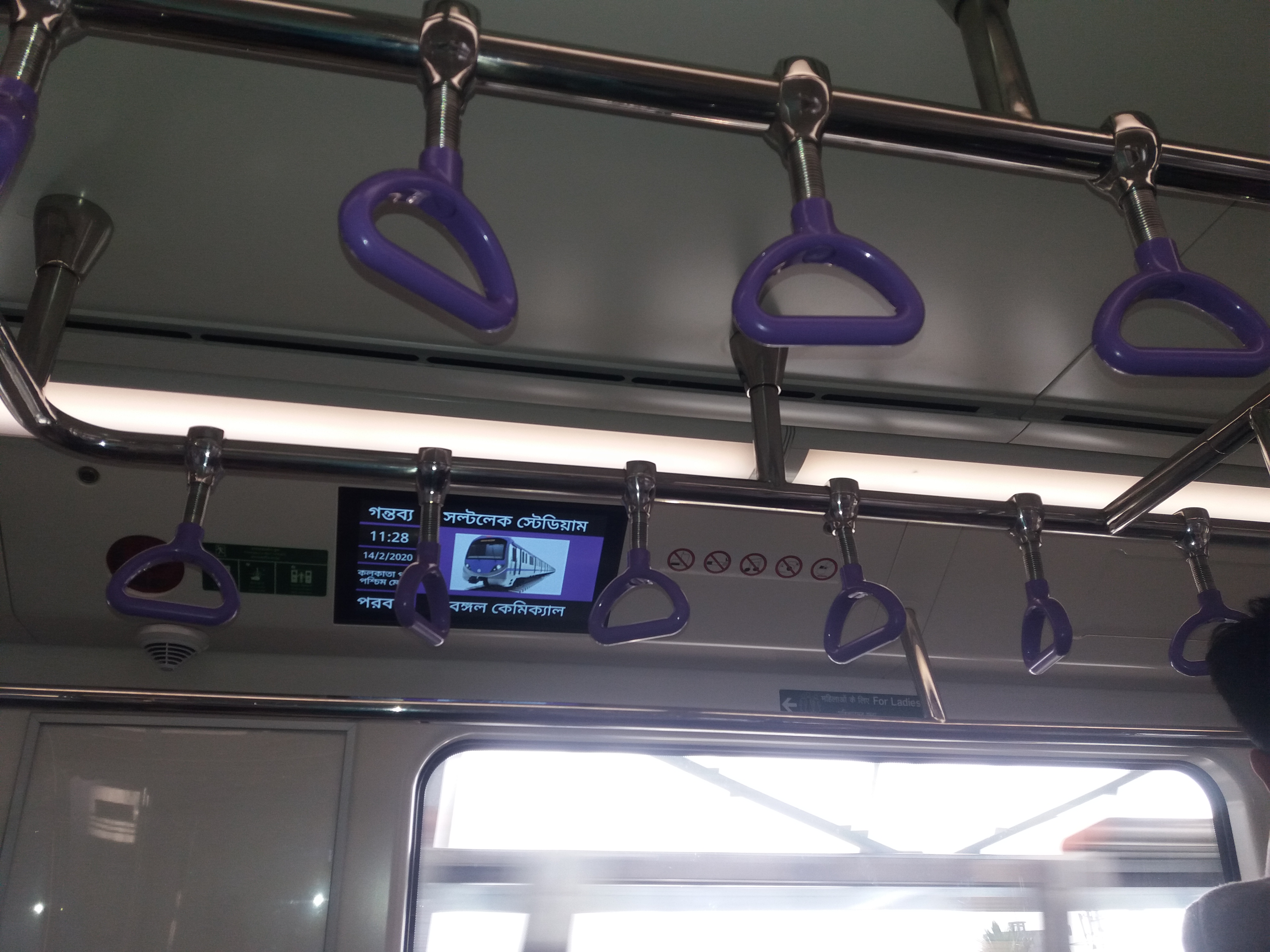
Display showing upcoming station details and ETA

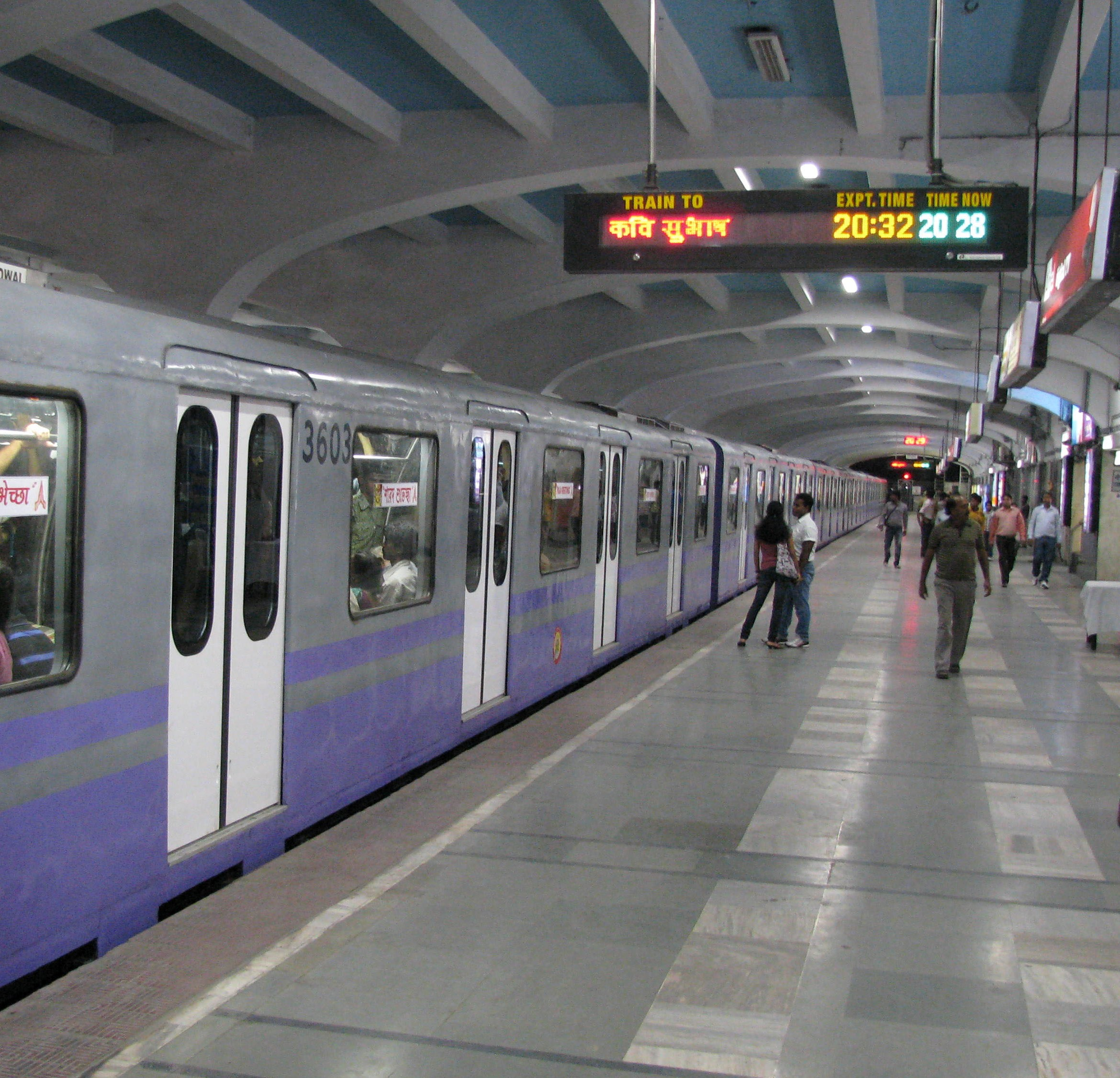
Display on platforms

Originally, there were a total of 358 services every day. However, the services and timings were changed due to the COVID-19 pandemic. As of November 2024, it operates between 06:50 and 22:40 IST. Trains run at an average speed of 23 km/h (14.29 mph) and stop for about 10 to 20 seconds at each station, depending on the crowd. All stations have display boards showing the terminating station, current time, scheduled time of arrival and estimated time of arrival of trains in Bengali, Hindi and English. Digital countdown clocks are also present in the stations. The coaches of blue and green line have line route-maps and all line have speakers and displays, which provide details of upcoming stations in the three languages. Navigation information is available on Google Maps. Kolkata Metro has launched its own official mobile app 'Amar Kolkata Metro' (initially released as 'Metro Ride Kolkata') for android & iOS smartphone users which provides information regarding station, train timing, fare and has online smart card recharge facility along with mobile QR code ticketing.

=== Station premises ===
Most stations have ticket counters and installed ATMs. Some stations have food outlets, and chemist stalls. To ease crowding for recharging smart cards, Automatic Card recharge machines are installed. On account of the Swacchota–i–Seba ("Cleanliness is service"), a nationwide awareness and mobilisation campaign on cleanliness, plastic bottle crushers were placed at multiple stations.

=== Fare ===
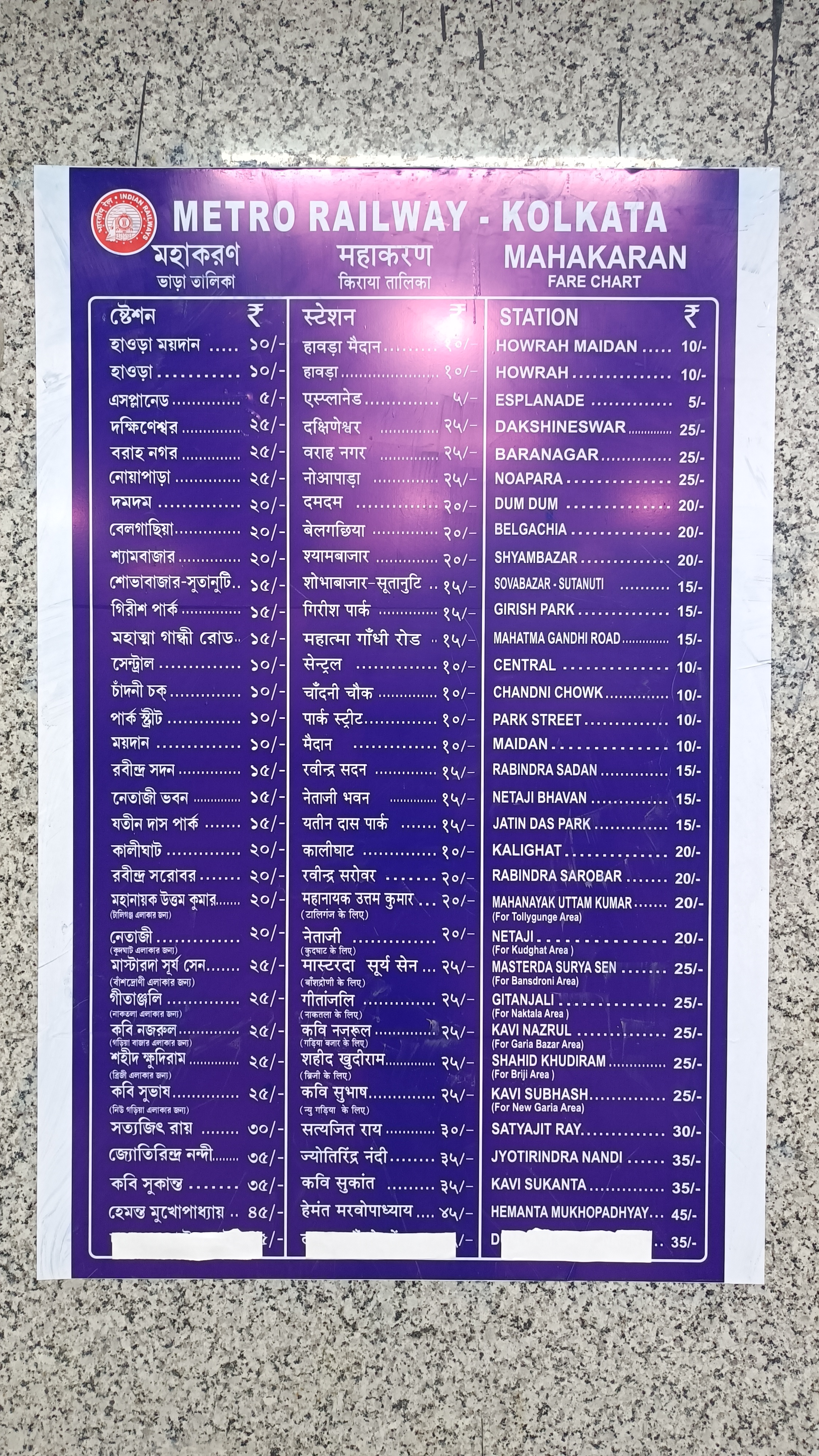
Kolkata Metro fare chart at Mahakaran metro station

The fare is based on the predetermined distance formulas. Kolkata Metro has the lowest starting fare in the country of ₹5 (equivalent to ₹6.00 or 6.4¢ US in 2026).

==== Blue Line ====
Distance (km)	Fare (₹)
0–2	5
2–5	10
5–10	15
10–20	20
More than 20	25

==== Other lines ====
Distance (km)	Fare (₹)
0–2	5
2–5	10
5–10	20
More than 10	30

=== Ticketing system ===
Kolkata meto uses AFC gates for fare collection monitoring entry and exits. Commuters can enter the metro station and travel through three ways:

- Paper QR code: Paper QR code ticketing system is used on all five operational lines: Blue Line, Green Line, Orange Line, Yellow Line and Purple Line.
- Mobile QR code: Commuters can opt for mobile QR code tickets via the "Aamar Kolkata Metro app" (formerly "Metro Ride Kolkata", which is available on both Google Play Store and iOS App Store). This system allows commuters to purchase and use mobile QR code tickets online for seamless travel. Tickets for multiple people can be purchased on a single device. Users have to scan the QR code each time to let one member pass in multi user tickets. Users have the option to take a screenshot of the QR code ticket for easy access during travel.
- Online Tickets: Recently Metro Railway Kolkata has started online ticketing system by Paytm app from 14 October 2026, where a commuter can book metro tickets using the Paytm app.
- Station QR code: Metro Railway has also started station QR code tickets where commuters can also purchase tickets by scanning the QR code stickers at the Metro stations.
- Smart card: Smart Cards are provided by Kolkata metro, which are helpful for daily commuters. Earlier, four different types of smart cards were used: Minimum Multi Ride (MMR), Limited Multi Ride (LMR), General Multi Ride (GMR) and Extended Multi Ride (EMR). They were withdrawn on 7 November 2013 and a single type of Smart Card (General Smart Card) was introduced. There is a compulsory refundable security deposit of ₹60 (equivalent to ₹77 or 82¢ US in 2026). The card is common for the Blue line, the Green line and the Orange line. Online smart card recharge facility was launched on 1 July 2020. These smart cards are not required to be submitted to the AFC gates at the arriving station and are to be carried by the passengers. These cards are required to be recharged if the previously recharged money is already spent. Recharge can be done by "Aamar metro" app or at any Add Value Machine (AVM) located in metro stations. Two new types of Tourist Smart Cards were also introduced (Tourist Smart Card – I and Tourist Smart Card – II). This type of smart card is for tourists and has unlimited rides. They cost ₹250 (equivalent to ₹320 or US$3.40 in 2026), valid for a day and ₹550 (equivalent to ₹710 or US$7.50 in 2026), valid for three days. A security deposit of ₹60 (equivalent to ₹77 or 82¢ US in 2026) is also charged.

Before these methods, from 2011 to January 2025, only tokens and smart cards were used as tickets. These tokens are touched on the machine to enter the station, while to exit from the destination station, it is required to submit the token into the machine. The current tokens are coin-shaped and made of plastic. From January 2025, ticket counters stopped giving token to passenger, as it was getting stolen.

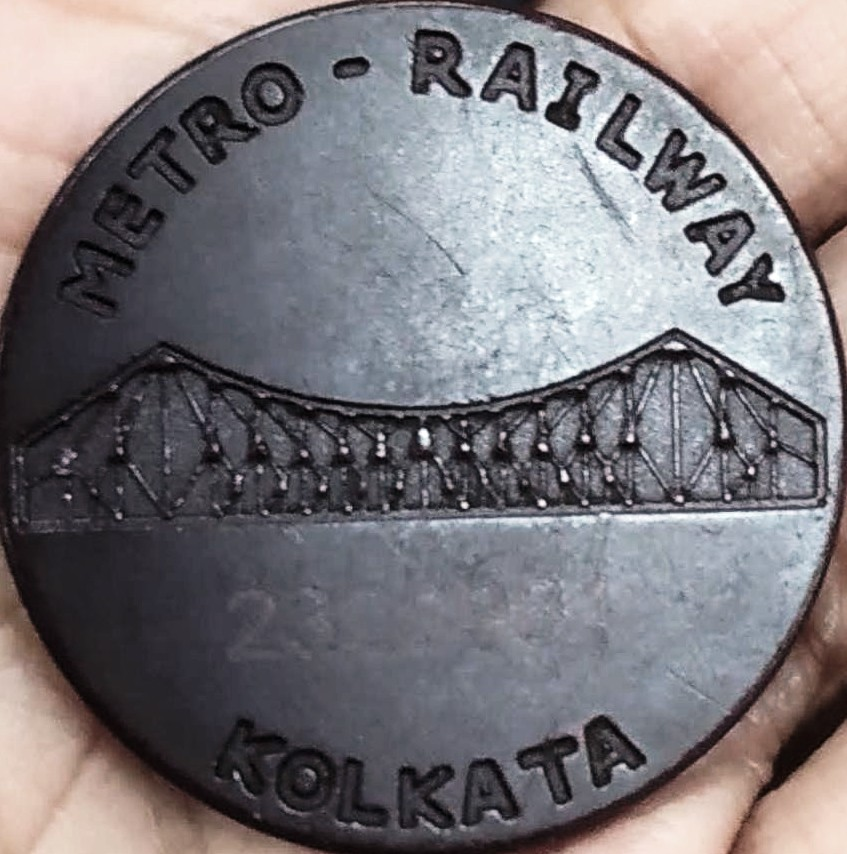
An old metro token

Before this, a magnetic ticketing strip system was used from 1984 to 2011. After introducing Radio-Frequency Identification (RFID) tokens by Centre for Railway Information Systems (CRIS) in partnership with Keltron in August 2011, the old magnetic strip reader gates were replaced with new RFID readers.

=== Durga Puja special services ===
The metro railway runs special night-long services during Durga Puja (Maha Saptami to Maha Navami) to help people travel faster and more conveniently for pandal-hopping. The services start at 13:00 and operate till 04:00 the next day. Pre-puja services are also run.

=== Security ===
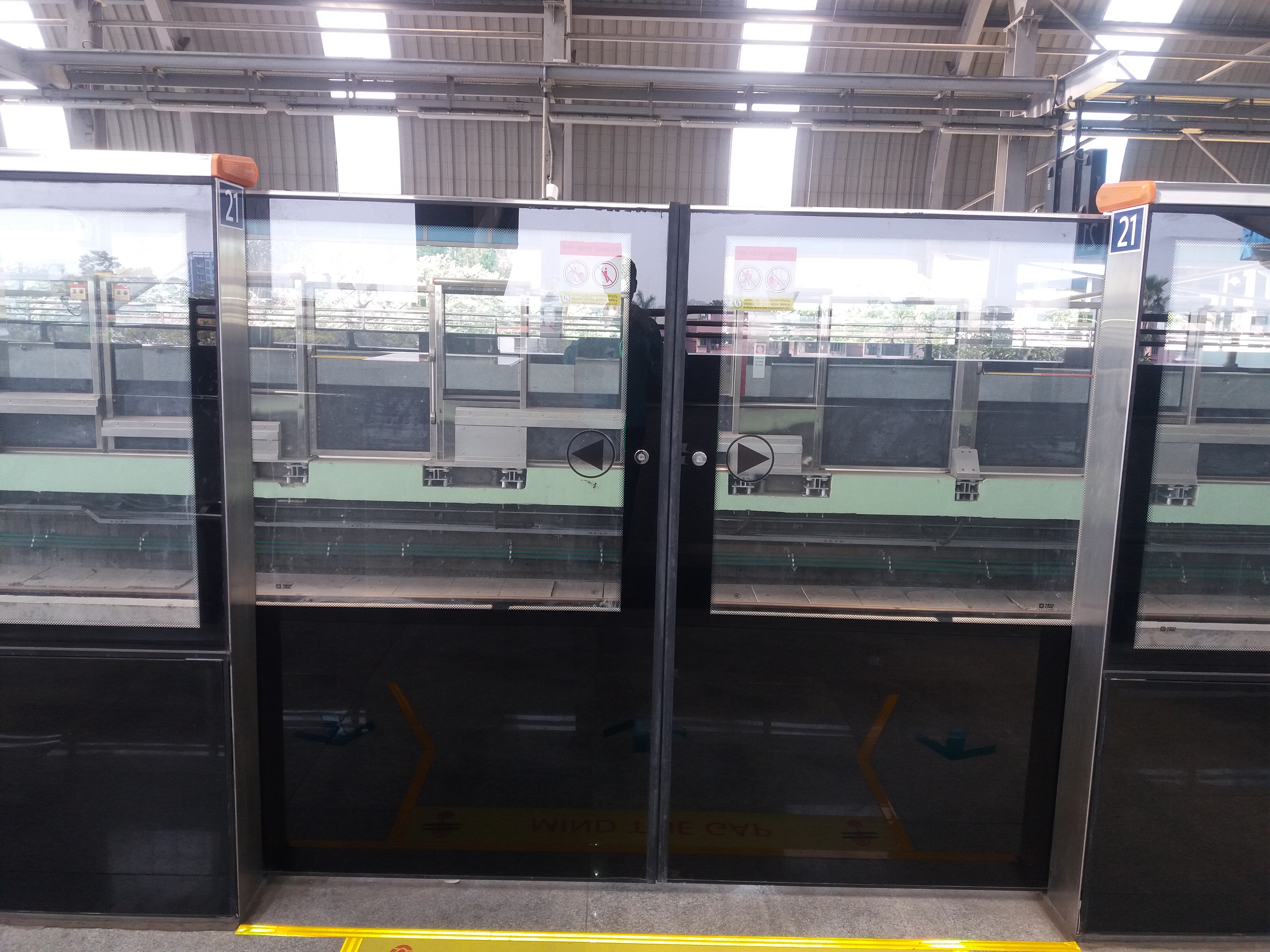
Platform screen door at Salt Lake Stadium metro station

All stations are equipped with closed-circuit cameras, metal detectors and baggage scanners. The Railway Protection Force provides security on the premises. Smoking is strictly prohibited in the metro premises. All stations in the Green Line have half-height and full-height platform screen doors for elevated and underground stations, respectively.

=== Seat reservation ===
In 2008, the Kolkata Metro Railway experimented with the practice of reserving two entire compartments for women. This system was found to be ineffective and caused inconvenience for a lot of commuters (including women) and the plan was dropped. Instead, certain sections of seats in each compartment are reserved for women, senior citizens and the physically challenged. The four-seat sections at each end of a coach are reserved for senior citizens and the physically challenged, and the two middle seat sections, between the general seat sections on each side, are reserved for women.

=== Other facilities ===
All stations have televisions that broadcast news and songs. WiFi was introduced at Park Street and Maidan metro station in 2016. Gradually, it was expanded to all the stations. The service is provided by Reliance Jio.

== Ridership ==
Kolkata Metro is the 4th busiest metro system in India as of 2024. 2,465 people travel by every Metro train in Kolkata against 1,110 in Delhi metro. Kolkata Metro carries around 700,000 people daily. The daily and annual ridership has consistently risen since 1984. Low fares and fast and convenient travel have contributed to the high ridership figures. During the 2019 Durga Puja, there was a record ridership of 922,000.

Kolkata Metro approximate daily ridership (last 30 years)
Year	Ridership
1996–97	171,468(+44.6%)
1997–98	189,411(+10.5%)
1998–99	158,975(-16.1%)
1999–2000	152,830(-3.9%)
2000–01	193,441(+26.6%)
2001–02	210,019(+8.6%)
2002–03	211,926(+0.9%)
2003–04	248,090(+17.1%)
2004–05	267,293(+7.7%)
2005–06	295,542(+10.6%)
2006–07	314,666(+6.5%)
2007–08	330,471(+5.0%)
2008–09	346,677(+4.9%)
2009–10	375,271(+8.3%)
2010–11	435,792(+16.1%)
2011–12	458,762(+5.3%)
2012–13	515,885(+12.4%)
2013–14	533,800(+3.5%)
2014–15	501,756(-6.0%)
2015–16	525,033(+4.6%)
2016–17	540,310(+2.9%)
2017–18	564,762(+4.5%)
2018–19	584,395(+3.5%)
2019–20	559,778(-4.2%)
2020–21	72,660(-87.0%)
2021–22	209,701(+188.6%)
2022–23	484,701(+131.1%)
2023–24	527,460(+8.8%)
2024–25	597,534(+13.3%)
2025–26	646,386(+8.17%)

Monthly Ridership Data of Metro Railway Kolkata
Year	Month [Fig. in Lakh]											
Year	Apr	May	Jun	Jul	Aug	Sep	Oct	Nov	Dec	Jan	Feb	Mar
2022 - 2023	124.87	124.23	129.13	145.58	150.62	173.84	145.42	157.08	166.77	156.65	143.45	151.49
2023 - 2024	142.87	153.78	146.61	161.37	166.60	163.75	183.74	151.62	168.51	166.11	152.30	167.94
2024 - 2025	175.36	171.21	170.97	192.85	186.06	198.58	196.23	180.48	192.95	187.66	158.70	170.14
2025 - 2026	172.75	175.12	172.55	187.55	188.84	225.22	190.58	204.54	221.30	217.00	197.30	207.06
2026 - 2027	203.17	203.40	213.71									

Complete ridership data of Kolkata Metro
Year	Annual passengers (in lakhs)	Approximate daily ridership
1984 - 1985	14.66	4,016
1985 - 1986	27.58	7,556
1986 - 1987	98.41	26,962
1987 - 1988	157.84	43,244
1988 - 1989	169.57	46,458
1989 - 1990	197.51	54,112
1990 - 1991	226.17	61,964
1991 - 1992	241.44	66,148
1992 - 1993	154.57	42,348
1993 - 1994	158.62	43,458
1994 - 1995	194.86	53,386
1995 - 1996	432.76	1,18,564
1996 - 1997	625.86	1,71,468
1997 - 1998	691.35	1,89,411
1998 - 1999	580.26	1,58,975
1999 - 2000	557.83	1,52,830
2000 - 2001	706.06	1,93,441
2001 - 2002	766.57	2,10,019
2002 - 2003	773.53	2,11,926
2003 - 2004	905.53	2,48,090
2004 - 2005	975.62	2,67,293
2005 - 2006	1078.73	2,95,542
2006 - 2007	1148.53	3,14,666
2007 - 2008	1206.22	3,30,471
2008 - 2009	1265.37	3,46,677
2009 - 2010	1369.74	3,75,271
2010 - 2011	1590.64	4,35,792
2011 - 2012	1674.48	4,58,762
2012 - 2013	1882.98	5,15,885
2013 - 2014	1948.37	5,33,800
2014 - 2015	1831.41	5,01,756
2015 - 2016	1916.37	5,25,033
2016 - 2017	1972.13	5,40,310
2017 - 2018	2061.38	5,64,762
2018 - 2019	2133.04	5,84,395
2019 - 2020	2043.19	5,59,778
2020 - 2021	265.21	72,660
2021 - 2022	765.41	2,09,701
2022 - 2023	1769.16	4,84,701
2023 - 2024	1925.23	5,27,460
2024 - 2025	2181	5,97,534
2025 - 2026	2359.31	6,46,849

== Infrastructure ==
=== Rolling stock ===
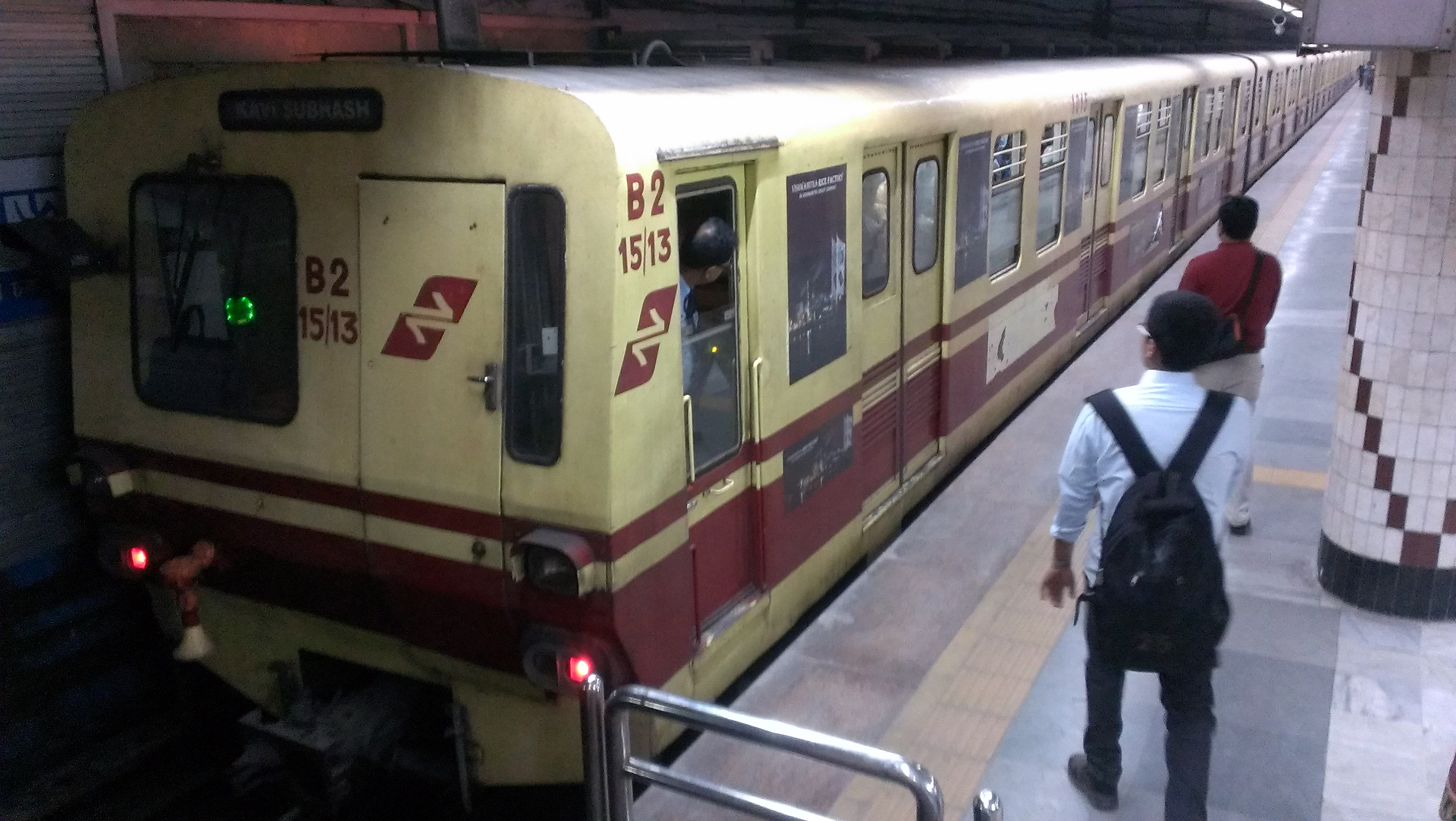
Old BHEL Non AC rakes. These were operational on the Blue Line from 1984 to 2018.

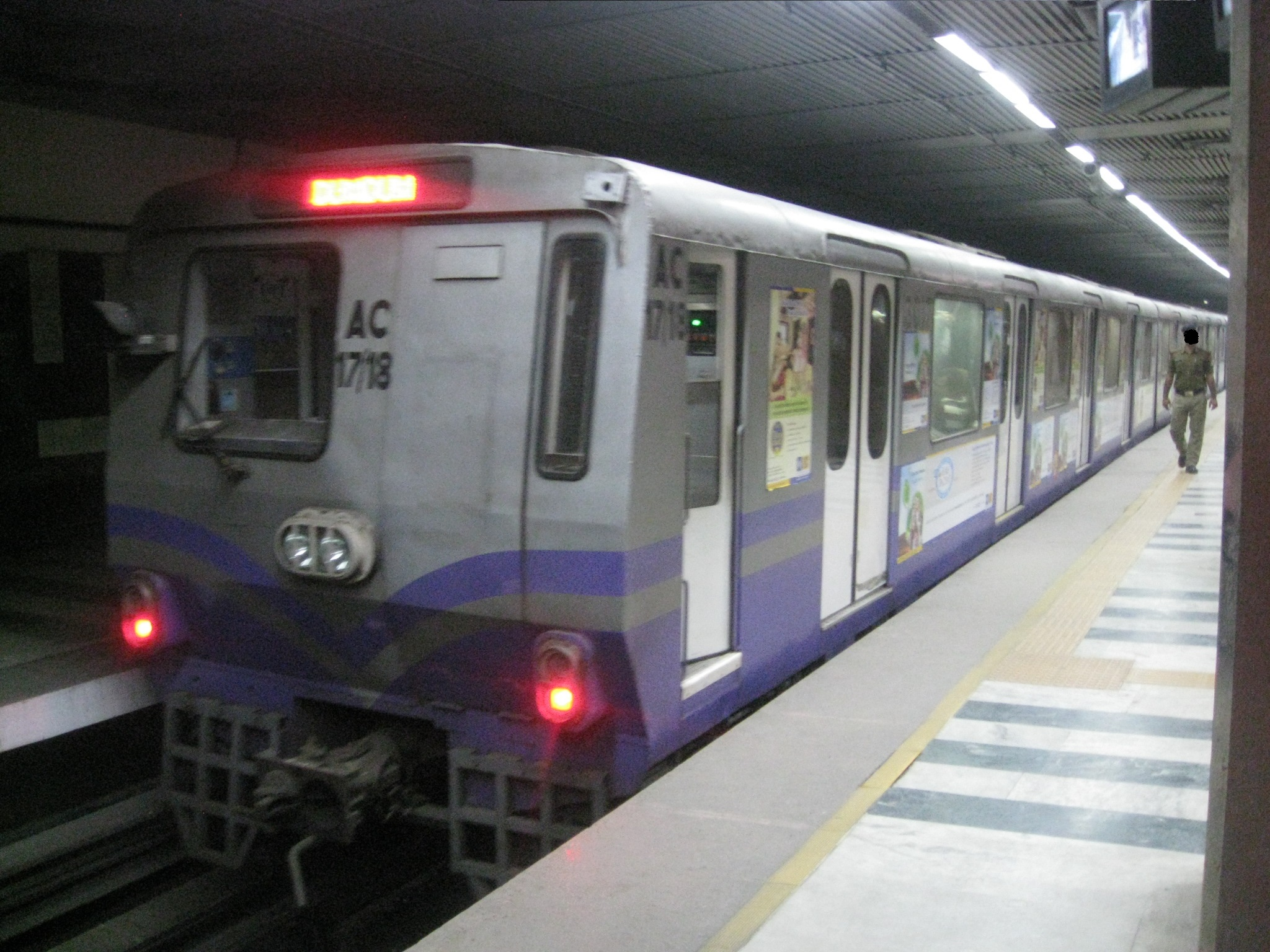
ICF BHEL rakes. These are operational only on the Blue and Yellow Liness since 2010 and 2025.

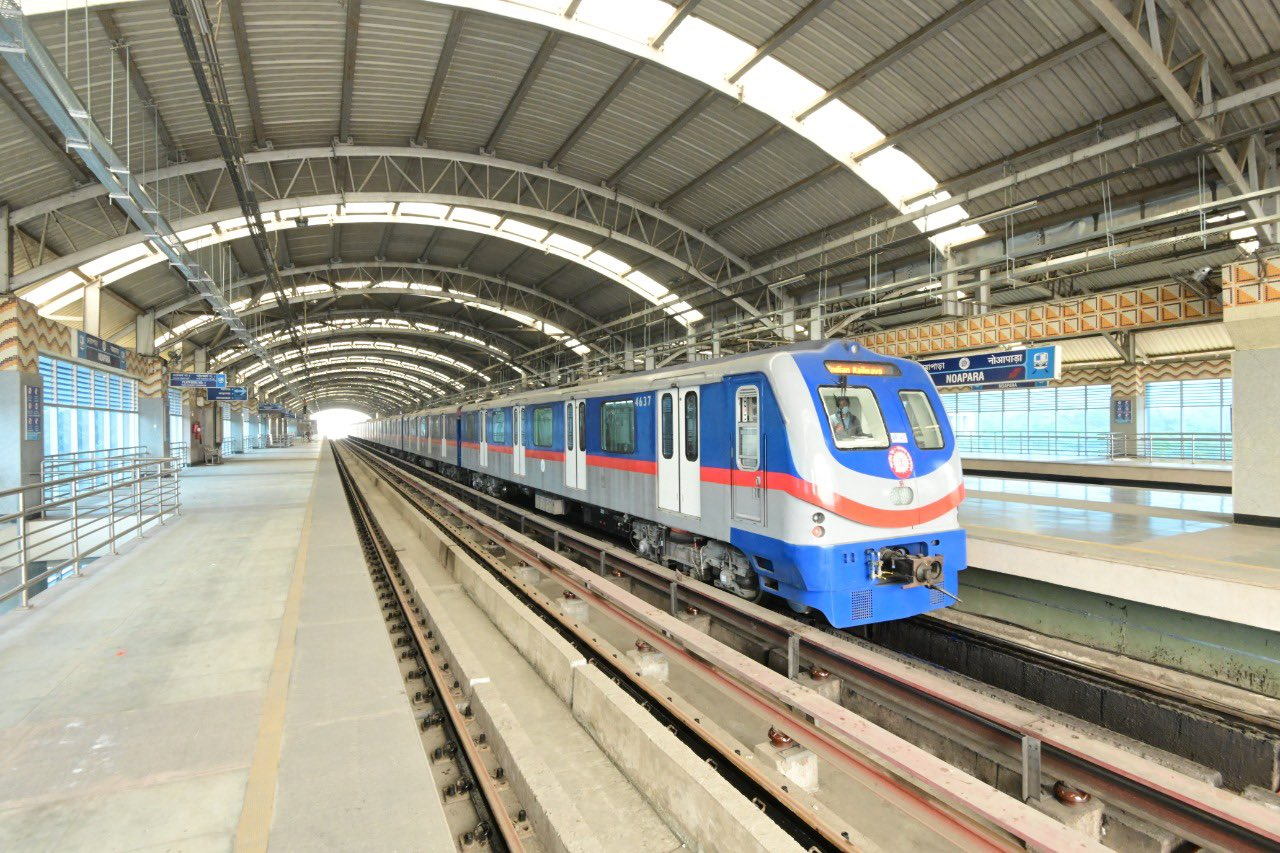
ICF\MEDHA rakes. These are operational on the Blue Line since 2019 and the Yellow, Purple and Orange Lines since their inauguration.

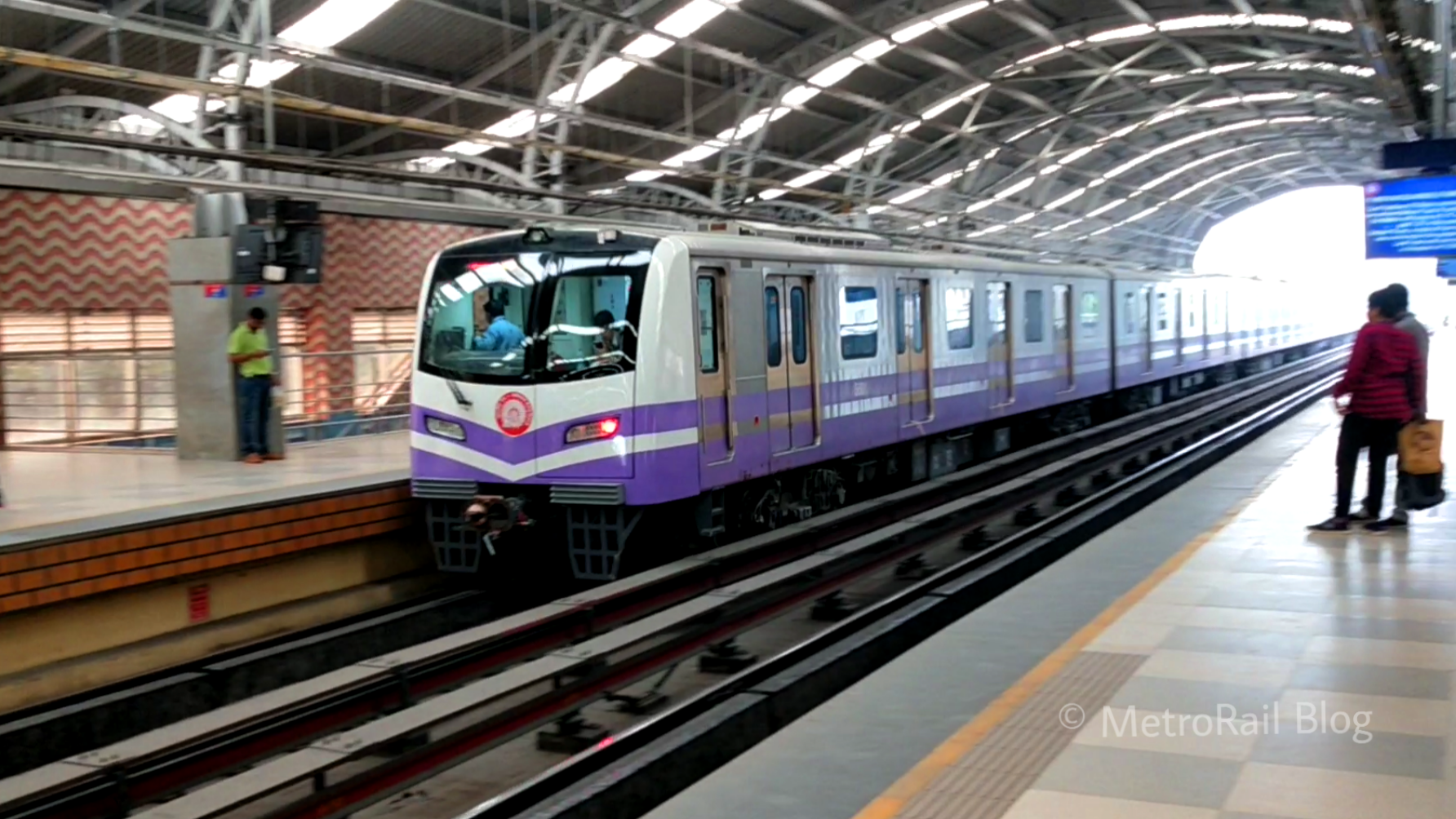
CRRC Dalian rakes. These are operational only on the Blue Line and the Yellow Line since 2023 and 2025.

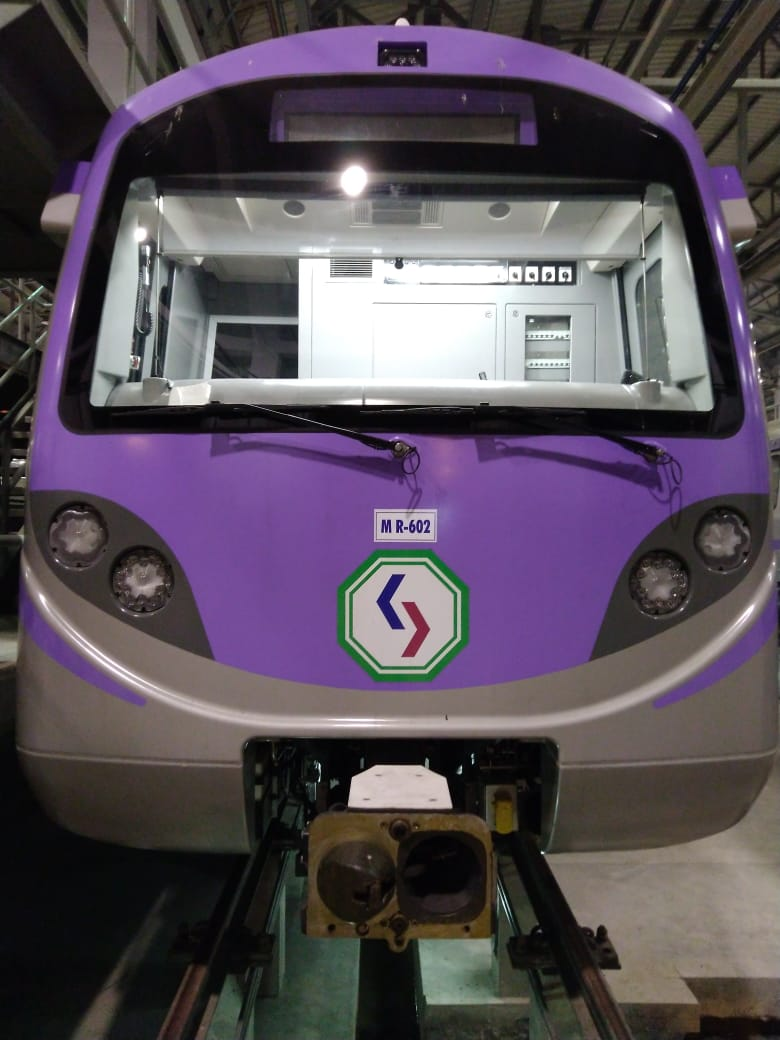
BEML rake, operational only on the Green Line since 2020

Kolkata Metro rolling stock consists of five main classes spread across its different lines, all powered by 750 V DC third-rail electrification. The Blue, Purple, Orange, and Yellow Lines run on broad gauge while the Green Line uses standard gauge. Early non-AC rakes (1000 and 2000 series) have been retired, replaced by modern AC stock. The ICF/BHEL 3000 series remains in service, while the ICF/MEDHA 4000 series introduced stainless steel bodies and regenerative braking, serving multiple lines. CRRC Dalian trains (MR-50) from China is used in the Blue and Yellow Lines. On the Green Line, BEML RS-3R rakes run on standard gauge with six-coach formations. Many of the newer trains support both CBTC and older signalling systems.

=== Depots and yards ===
There are 5 operational depots now. The Noapara, Tollygunge and New Garia depots serve the Blue Line, the New Garia depot also serve the Orange Line, while the Central Park depot serves the Green Line and the Joka depot serves the Purple Line. A depot at New Town for the Orange Line is under construction. An underground yard was made at the airport.

=== Stations and electrification ===
As of 2025, Kolkata metro has the deepest metro station and largest underground metro station in India. Howrah metro station of Green Line is the deepest metro station in India with depth of 34 m (112 ft). Also at the time of inauguration, it was the largest metro station of India. In August 2025, Jai Hind metro station of the Yellow Line became the largest metro station in India, as well as one of the largest in Asia.

The standard length of platforms in Kolkata Metro is 170 m. The stations of Gitanjali and Netaji have the shortest platforms of 163 m. The average length between any two stations is 1.14 km (0.71 mi). The shortest distance is 0.597 km (0.371 mi) between Central and Chandni Chowk, and the longest distance is 2.45 km (1.52 mi) between Sealdah and Esplanade. Since the Kolkata Metro has 750 V DC third rail electrification, electricity substations were built in Jatin Das Park, Central and Shyambazar.

=== Signalling and telecommunication ===
==== Blue Line ====
Trains operate on typical Indian Railways automatic signaling technology. A Route Relay Interlocking System has been provided at New Garia depot and Tollygunge depot and Electronic Interlocking has been provided at Noapara depot to facilitate the prompt withdrawal and injection of rakes and to perform shunting operations inside the car shed for maintenance purposes. The Train Protection and Warning System (TPWS) is provided throughout the Metro Railway. It is designed to prevent collisions caused by human (operator) error. A Train Describer System and Auto Train Charting are utilized to assist the operation control centre in monitoring and planning train movements in real-time. An Integrated Power Supply System and microprocessor-based Data Logger System have also been provided. An integrated system of STM-1 and STM-4 optical fibre cable is used for all telecommunication, signaling, SCADA and other circuits in Blue line. The service is provided by RailTel.

An upgrade of the existing signaling system of the Blue Line from Indian Railways signalling to Communications-based train control (CBTC) was planned by Metro Railway, Kolkata at ₹467 crore (equivalent to ₹600 crore or US$64 million in 2026) and the proposal was sent to Indian Railways, so that time interval between trains can be decreased to just 90 seconds from 5 minutes. In August 2019, Indian Railways gave the go-ahead to the proposal, and installation work is supposed to be complete within 2–3 years.

==== Green Line ====
Unlike the previous line, the Green line adopted a more advanced CBTC system. It has cab signalling and a centralised automatic train control system consisting of automatic operation, protection, and signaling modules. The signaling system is provided by Italy-based company Ansaldo STS. The other signalling equipment includes an integrated system with fibre optic cable, SCADA, radios, and a public-address system.

==== Purple and Orange Line ====
A CBTC system on the Purple and Orange Lines is currently in activated mode.

==== Yellow Line ====
The Indian railways signalling system, Kavach with ATP and ATO, is planned to be used on the Yellow Line.

=== Public address system ===
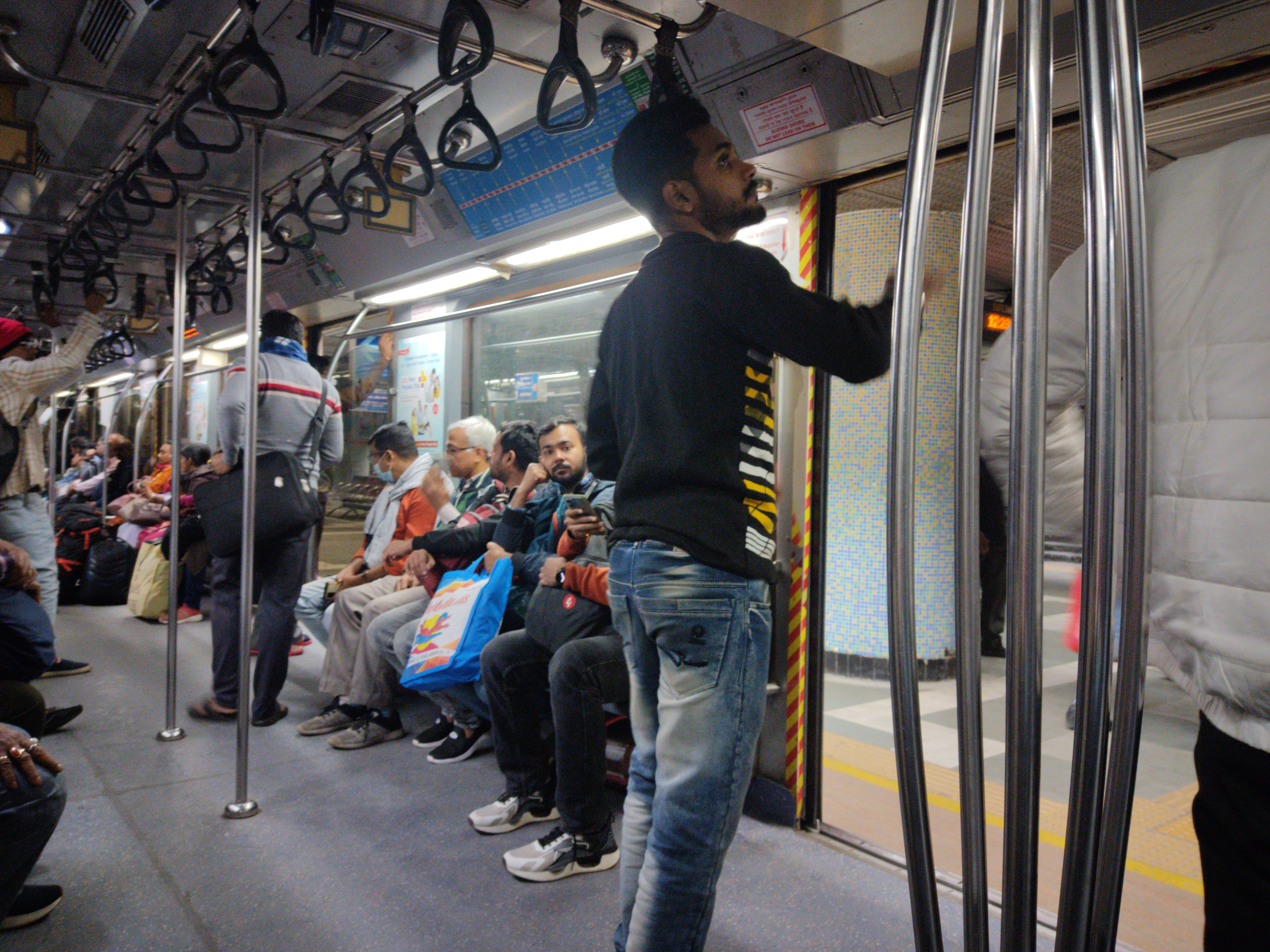
Inside a Dum Dum bound Blue Line Kolkata metro train

PA systems are present at all stations and their premises. A station master can make a necessary announcement to the passengers and staff, overriding the ongoing local announcement. Train PA systems are controlled by the motormen for announcements to passengers on a particular train.

== Issues ==
Since the Kolkata Metro was constructed in the 1970s, there were some technical limitations. Due to the tunnel dimensions, and being under Indian Railways, Kolkata Metro opted for an Indian metre gauge shell (2.7 m width) mounted upon 1,676 mm (5 ft 6 in) broad gauge bogies. The rakes have to be custom built and require a special assembly line involving additional costs, thus limiting the options for rake manufacturers for Blue Line. From its inception, the coaches were manufactured by ICF, which lacked the prerequisite knowledge for manufactured non-air-conditioning rakes. The 3000 and 4000 series rakes were faulty and delivered without any trials. In addition, Indian Railways signaling is used instead of European signaling. All of these factors have led to snags, delays, and accidents.

Unlike Delhi Metro, Kolkata Metro is owned and operated by Indian Railways instead of an autonomous body, and it relies solely on Indian Railways for every decision, from funding to route realignment.

=== Underground tunnels ===
In densely populated areas, there are no free spaces left to build elevated metro tracks and stations. As a result, underground systems are constructed in these areas. However, the construction of an underground metro tunnel in the Bowbazar area has caused cracks in the houses of many residents. Consequently, the metro authority had to evacuate the people, leading to massive delays and slow development in the construction of the metro railway in that area.

== See also ==
- Transport in Kolkata
  - Kolkata Suburban Railway
  - Trams in Kolkata
- Urban rail transit in India
- List of rapid transit systems
- List of metro systems
- List of suburban and commuter rail systems
- Zones and divisions of Indian Railways
