= Haridas Dutta =

Bengali revolutionary (1890-1976)

- Born: 16 November 1890; Dhaka, British India
- Died: 29 February 1976 (aged 85)
- Occupation: Revolutionary
- Organization: Bengal Volunteers
- Movement: Indian Freedom Movement

Haridas Dutta (16 November 1890 — 29 February 1976) was a Bengali revolutionary involved with Rodda company arms heist case.

== Early life ==
Dutta was born in 1890 in Dhaka, British India. He came in contact with senior Bengali revolutionary Hemchandra Ghosh and joined in Mukti Sangha. In 1912, Dutta and Khagendra Nath Das entered into Alexander Jute Mill near Jagatdal as labour and worked there for three months to assassinate a British engineer. But they failed and fled away from there.

== Rodda arms heist ==
While Shrish Chandra Mitra alias Habu informed about the consignment of arms and ammunition of the Radda Company, activists Bipin Behari Ganguli, Bagha Jatin, Anukul Mukherjee and others planned to rob this. The date for the heist was fixed on 26 August 1914. Dutta meet lawyer PD Himmatsinka, at Mitra Lane, Kolkata. Himmatsinka with the help of a barber gave Dutta a bullock cart driver look. On 26 August Shrish Chandra Mitra loaded 10 boxes of ammunition containing 50 Mauser pistol and huge number of Cartridge in a cart driven by Dutta. He led the cart from Kolkata Port to Molonga lane via Mission row with the help of Srish Pal and Khagendra Nath Das. Dutta was arrested on 11 October 1914 and imprisoned in a solitary cell of Presidency Jail, latter transferred to in Hazaribag Central Jail and imprisoned for 4 years. After completion of World War I he was released and again took pivotal role of revolutionary activities of Bengal Volunteers group in between 1930 and 1934 in Dhaka, Comilla, Medinipur and Kolkata. He gave shelter to Benoy Basu after assassination of Mr. Lowman, the Inspector General of Police. Dutta was popular and known as Mejda to the members of Bengal Volunteers. He was also involved with Writers Building attack by Benoy, Badal and Dinesh.
