= Anthony Firingee =

Indian singer, writer and folk poet

Anthony Firingee (1786–1836; Bengali: Antōnī Phiringī, lit. 'Anthony the foreigner'), born as Hensman Anthony, was a Bengali language kavigan singer-writer and folk poet of Portuguese origin known for his works in Bengali devotional songs in the early part of the 19th century. He was also noted for his performance in literary face-offs known as Kavigan.

== Biography ==
Born Hensman Anthony, the sobriquet Firingee (though an Indian by birth) was used colloquially as a reference to his Portuguese origins. Although not much is known of his early life, Anthony arrived in Bengal sometime in early 19th century and subsequently came to settle in Farashdanga, in the town of Chandannagar in West Bengal.

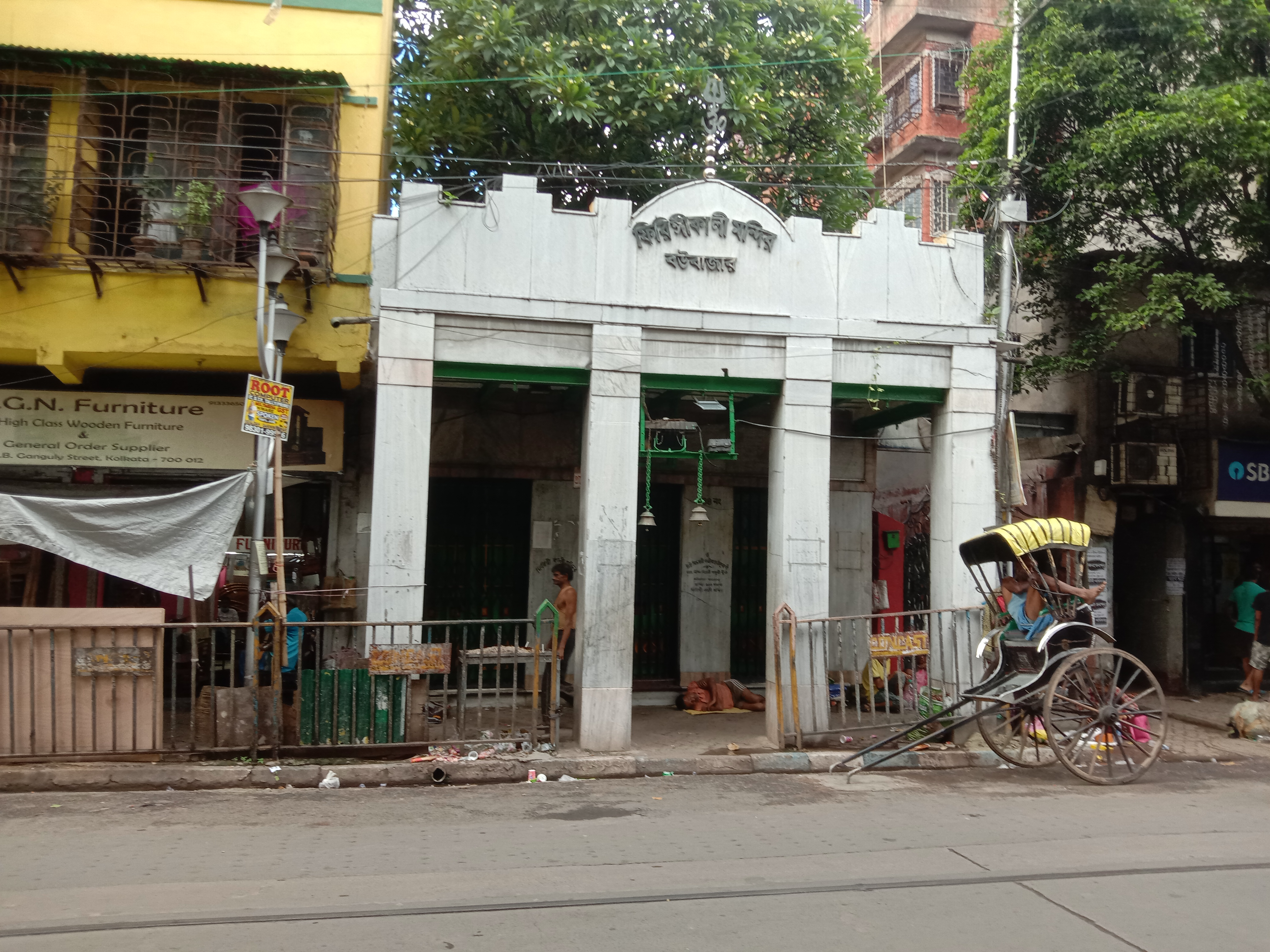
Front view of Firingi Kalibari, in Bowbazar, Kolkata.

He married a Hindu Brahmin widow named Saudamini and was deeply influenced by Bengali culture and language, as well as the Hindu religion. Eventually, Anthony came to learn the language and composed a number of noted religious songs in devotion to the Goddesses Kali and Durga. He is noted for his Agamani Songs, celebrating the return of Goddess Durga to her parents home that marks the Bengali Autumn festival of Durga Puja. Anthony is also noted for his literary face-offs in Kavigans, or Bard's duels, with a number of noted Bengali composers including Bhola Moira, Ram Basu and Thakur Singha. Anthony also helped construct a temple to Goddess Kali in the Bowbazar locality of Central Calcutta known as 'Firinghi Kalibari'. His wife Saudamini was burnt to death, for being a widow and remarrying Anthony, who was a foreigner.

== In popular culture ==
Books

The first reference to Anthony Firingee is a novel by Madan Bandyopadhyay titled Kabiyal Anthony Firingee.

Films

- A 1967 Bengali film by director Sunil Bannerjee portrayed the life and works of Anthony, and had Bengali actor Uttam Kumar in the title role. The film was noted for its music, composed by Anil Bagchi & lyrics by Gouri Prasanna Majumdar among others and earned Uttam Kumar an Indian National Film Award for Best Actor in 1968.
- A 2014 adaptation by director Srijit Mukherji titled Jaatishwar featured the life of Anthony from a retrospective view but with a modern-day context. Bengali actor Prosenjit Chatterjee acted in the title role. Jaatishwar also received an Indian National Film Awards in 2014, in four categories, including Best singer and Best Music Director.
