= Anukul Chandra Mukherjee =

Indian writer and thinker (1888–1968)

Anukul Chandra Mukerji
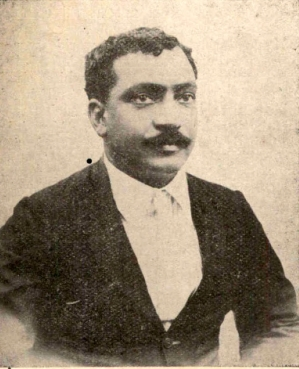
- Born: 1888; India
- Died: 2 May 1968 (aged 79–80); 18 Tagore Town, Allahabad, UP, India
- Occupations: Academic; Writer; Teacher; Philosopher
- Known for: Philosophical writings
- Awards: Padma Bhushan

Anukul Chandra Mukerji (1888–1968) was an Indian revolutionary, academic, thinker, writer and a professor of philosophy at Allahabad University. He was conspirator of Rodda company arms heist, along with Bipin Behari Ganguli. He was known for his studies on the philosophy of European thinkers such as Immanuel Kant and Georg Wilhelm Friedrich Hegel, psychologists like William James, John B. Watson, and James Ward as well as the Advaita Vedanta of Adi Shankara. He was the author two notable books, Self, Thought, and Reality and The Nature of Self, and several articles and is known to have employed western methodology and language styles in his academic pursuit. The Government of India awarded him the third highest civilian honour of the Padma Bhushan, in 1964, for his contributions to education and literature.
