= Chandni Chowk, Kolkata =

Chandni Chowk
- Neighbourhood in Kolkata (Calcutta)
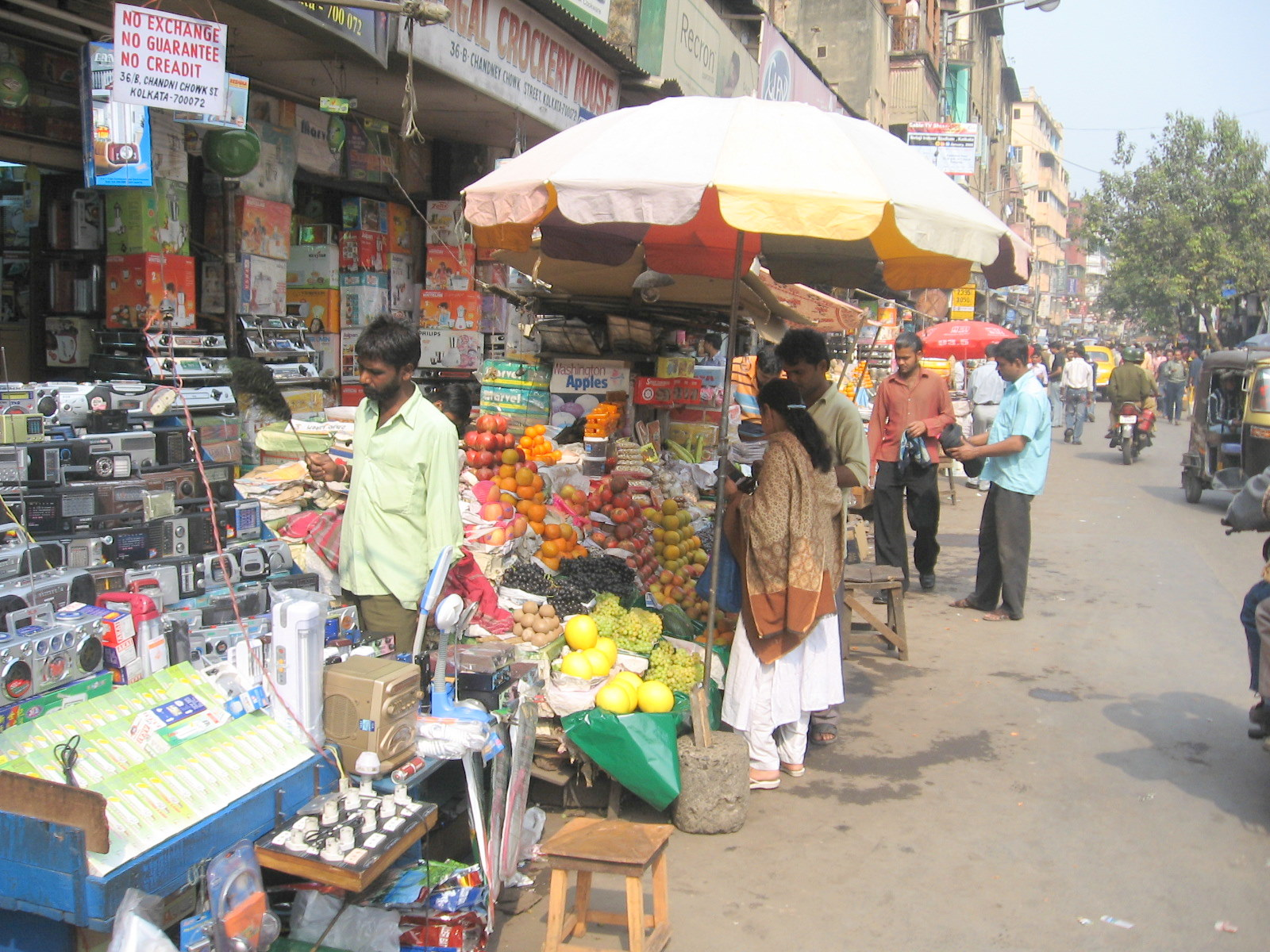
- Chandni Chowk market

- Location in Kolkata
- Coordinates: 22°33′56″N 88°21′24″E
- Country: India
- State: West Bengal
- City: Kolkata
- District: Kolkata
- Metro Station: Chandni Chowk
- Area code: +91 33
- Lok Sabha constituency: Kolkata Uttar
- Vidhan Sabha constituency: Chowrangee

Chandni Chowk is a neighbourhood of Central Kolkata in Kolkata district in the Indian state of West Bengal. It is famous for its old and cheap market of computer software products and hardwares, and had been listed as a notorious market in 2009 and 2010 by the USTR for selling counterfeit software, media and goods.

== History ==
Chandni Chowk which is an economical hub and marketplace in North Kolkata, existed as early as 1784. A. Upjohn's map of 1784 of Calcutta describes it as "Chandney Choke Bazar", "Chandney Bazaar ka rastah", "Chandnee Choke" or "Goreeamar Lane". Kolkata Municipal Corporation records show that before 1937, that one of the lanes were called Guriama Lane in local. In February 1937, the name was officially changed to Chandney Approach. In 1938, again it was renamed aas Chandni Chowk Street. It was speculated the name was given after Delhi’s Chandni Chowk as a symbol of acknowledgement for the Mughals whose capital was at Delhi at that time.

W.H. Carey speculates that the name came from the canopies or the semi-permanent roofs (chadna, in Bengali) above shops that had sprung up over the years. The market existed in 19th century. R.J. Minney's "Round about Calcutta" (1922) says that Chandni Chowk contained garment markets, cycle shops, camera shops, pigeon stalls for cigarettes and sherbet. Hawkers and shopkeepers with semi-permanent structures continue to occupy every square inch of the space. In 1907, KMC bought land to widen Chandney Chowk Streets, but that did not help passersby.

In October 1994, Chandni Chowk came under metro corridor as the stretch from Esplanade to Chandni Chowk was authorised for construction.

== Market ==
Chandni Chowk is known for it being the oldest and biggest software and hardware market in West Bengal. Multiple technology companies had their main offices and service centres in Chandni Chowk due to its cheap and nearest facilities.

== Transport ==
Central Ave, which is one the main road connectors between South and North Calcutta, passes through Chandni Chowk. Also Lenin Sarani of Kolkata road passes through Chandni Chowk which connects it directly to Sealdah. Chandni Chowk metro station and Esplanade metro station are nearest metro stations of the North South metro corridor. Esplanade serves also as metro station of the East West metro corridor of Kolkata.

== See also ==
- Bidhan Sarani
- Boubazar
- College Street
- Dharmatala
