= Lalbazar =

Coordinates: 24°01′N 87°39′E

- Neighbourhood in Kolkata (Calcutta)
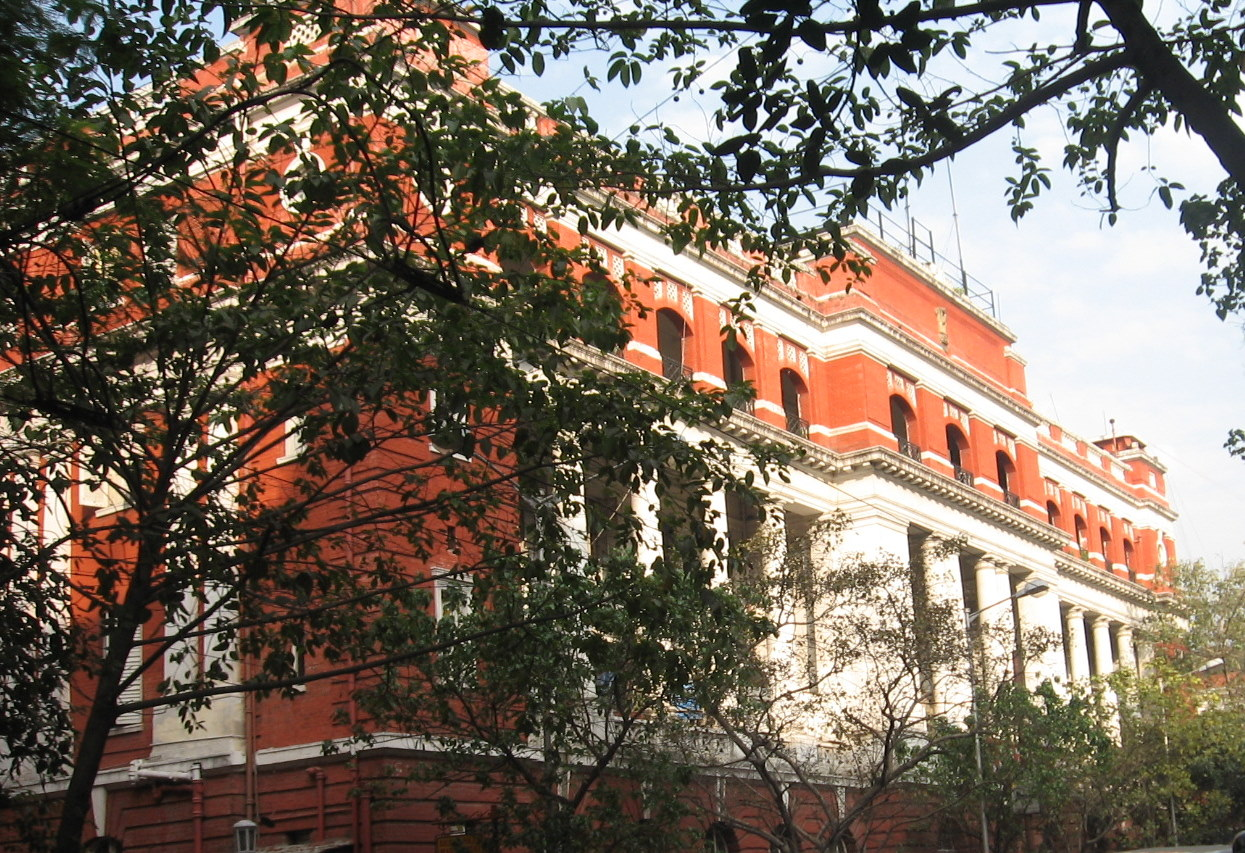

- Location in Kolkata
- Country: India
- State: West Bengal
- City: Kolkata
- District: Kolkata
- Metro Station: Central and Mahakaran
- Municipal Corporation: Kolkata Municipal Corporation
- KMC wards: 45, 46
- Elevation: 36 ft (11 m)

Population
  - Total: For population see linked KMC ward pages
- Time zone: UTC+5:30 (IST)
- PIN: 700001
- Area code: +91 33
- Lok Sabha constituency: Kolkata Uttar
- Vidhan Sabha constituency: Chowranghee

Lalbazar is a neighbourhood in Central Kolkata, earlier known as Calcutta, in the Indian state of West Bengal. It is part of the central business district adjoining B.B.D. Bagh area. The headquarters of the Kolkata Police is located here (18, Lalbazar Street) and is popularly known by the same name.

== History ==
The road leading from the north-east corner of B.B.D. Bagh to Bowbazar was earlier known as ‘Avenue to the eastward’. It was also known as the Great Bungalo Road. In 1768, it was said to be the best street in Kolkata. The modern police office was the residence of John Palmer, one of the merchant princes of Kolkata. Earlier to that it was said to be ‘an old ruin of a house, formerly the residence of some native.’ The house next to it was the Harmonic Tavern, the handsomest house in its day and pulled down long back.

Punishment in old Kolkata was often done by hanging. There was a gibbet at the crossing of Lalbazar and Chitpore Road (now Rabindra Sarani).

== Transport ==
=== Road ===
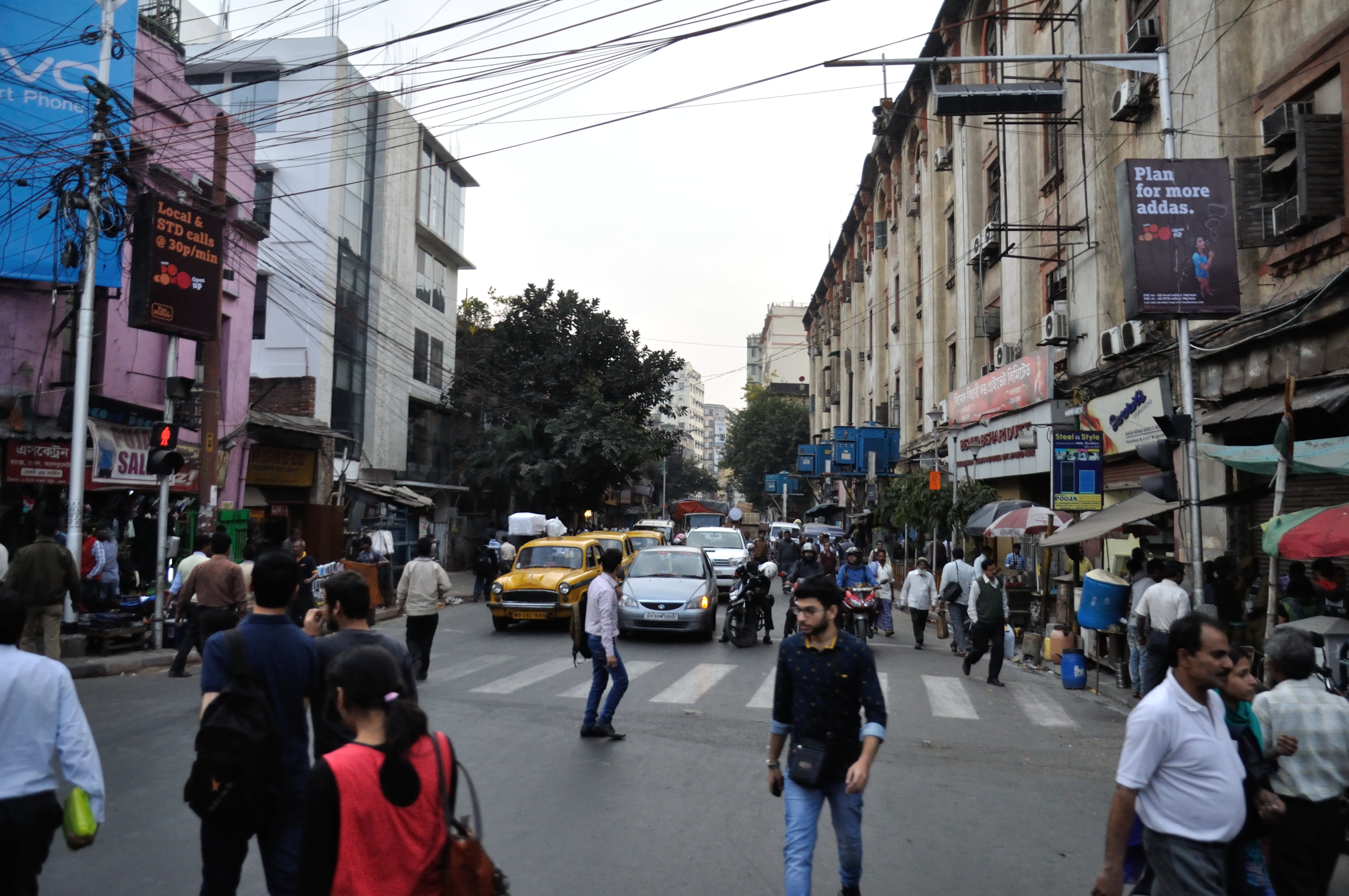
Bentinck Street and Lalbazar Street Junction

Lalbazar is surrounded by Old Court House Street on the west, Bentinck Street/Rabindra Sarani on the east, India Exchange Place Road on the north and R.N. Mukherjee Road on the south. Lalbazar Street (westward extension of Bepin Behari Ganguly Street) passes through the middle of the area from east to west. Many buses ply along these roads.

=== Train ===
B.B.D Bag railway station on Kolkata Circular Railway line is the nearest railway station.
