= Bepin Behari Ganguly Street =

Road in Kolkata, India

- B.B. Ganguly Street
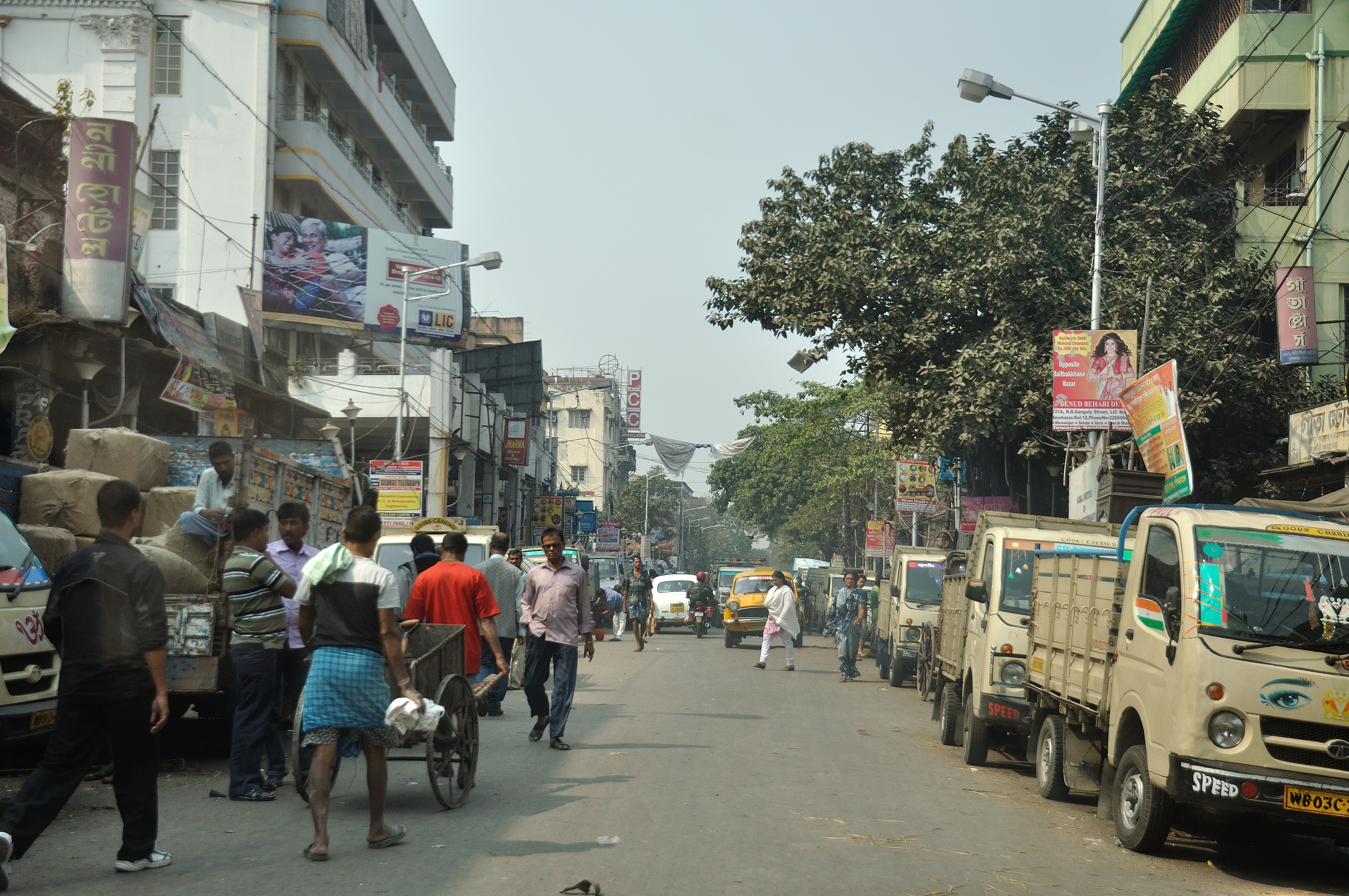
- Former name(s): Bowbazar Street
- Maintained by: Kolkata Municipal Corporation
- Location: Kolkata, India
- Postal code: 700012, 700014
- Nearest Kolkata Metro station: Mahakaran (under construction), Central and Sealdah
- Coordinates: 22°34′11.19″N 88°21′28.52″E
- west end: Lalbazar
- east end: Sealdah

Bepin Behari Ganguly Street, or B.B. Ganguly Street, formerly known as Bow Bazar Street or Bowbazar Street, is an east-west road in Central Kolkata, capital of the Indian state of West Bengal. It passes through Bowbazar area and connects Baithakkhana Market (Sealdah) and Sealdah Station with Bentinck Street/Rabindra Sarani crossing (Lalbazar) via Amherst Street crossing, Nirmal Chandra Street/College Street crossing and Central Avenue crossing. West of Bentinck Street crossing, B.B. Ganguly Street becomes Lalbazar Street. This road's name is a tribute for Bepin Behari Ganguly, a famous freedom-fighter and politician of India.

== Significance ==
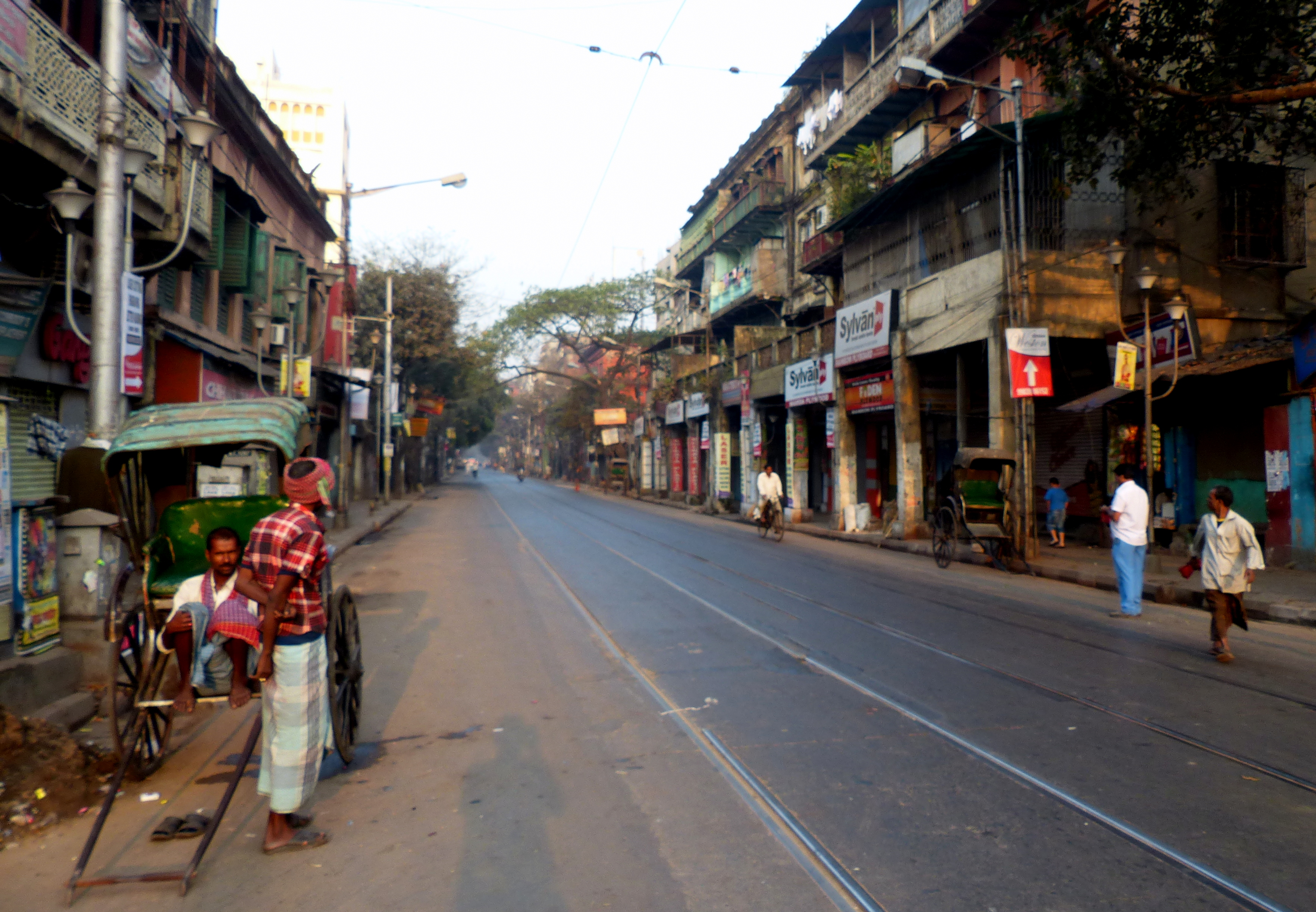
Bepin Behari Ganguly Street

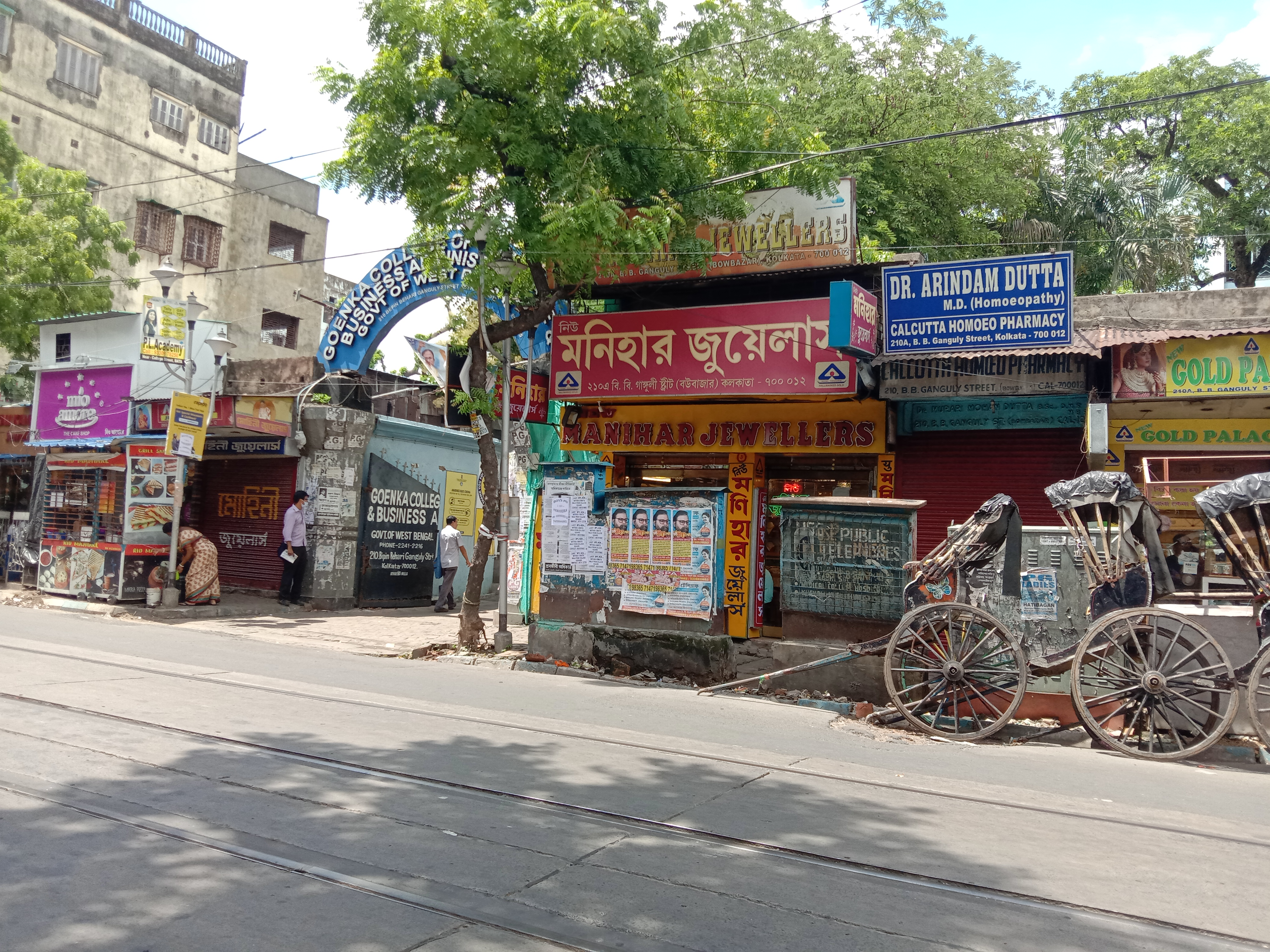
Goenka College of Commerce and Business Administration entrance

The multitude of commuters who deport train at Sealdah Station (from Kolkata Suburban Railway) use this road to reach Lalbazar and B.B.D. Bagh (the central business district of the city) easily. The eastern portion of the road (just after its starting from Sealdah) is very congested due to the location of Baithakkhana Market (a vegetable wholesale market). The road is one-way, traffic runs from the direction of Sealdah towards Lalbazar and B.B.D. Bagh.

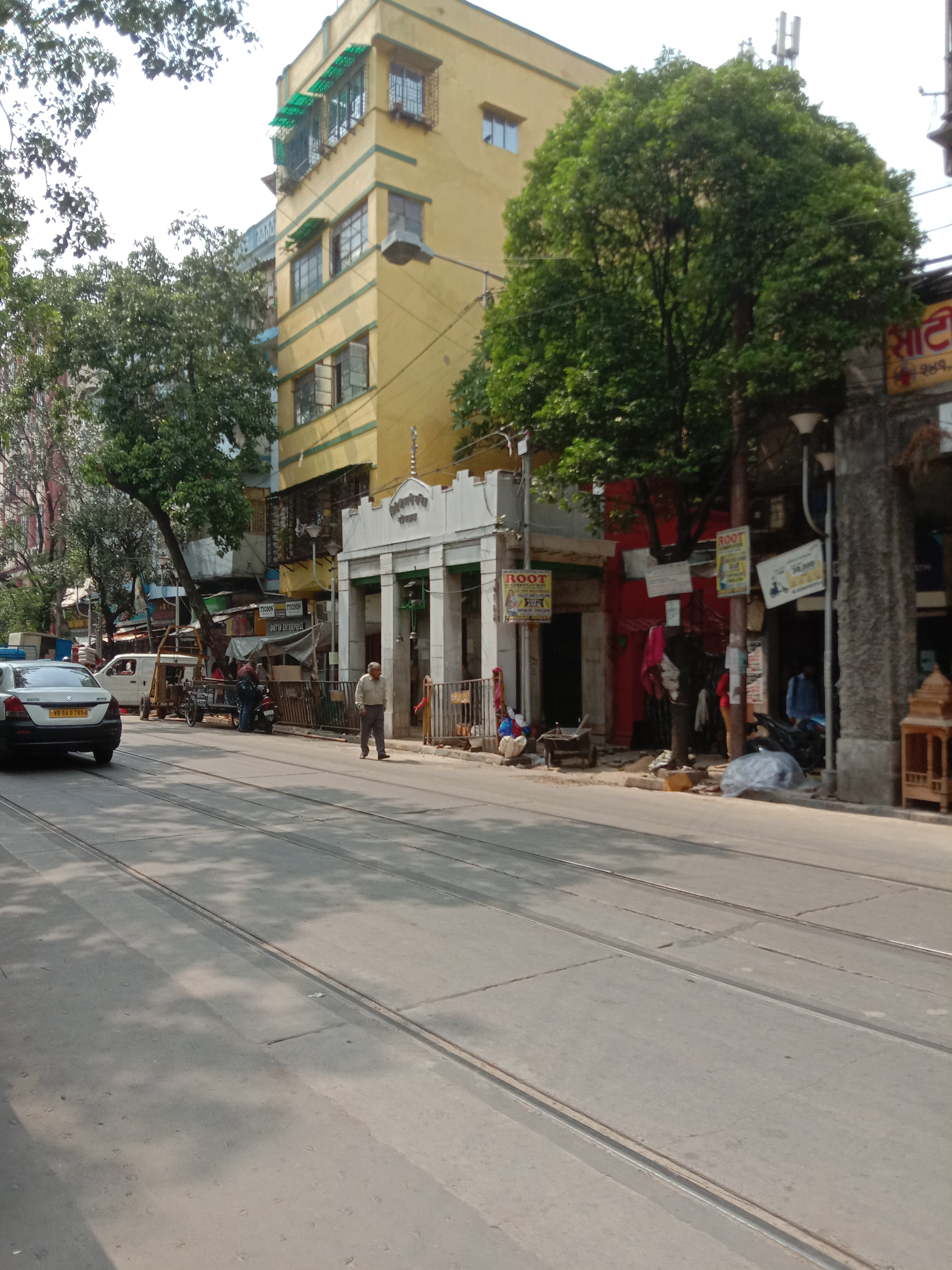
Firinghi Kalibari at B.B. Ganguly Street in Bowbazar, Kolkata, May 2022.

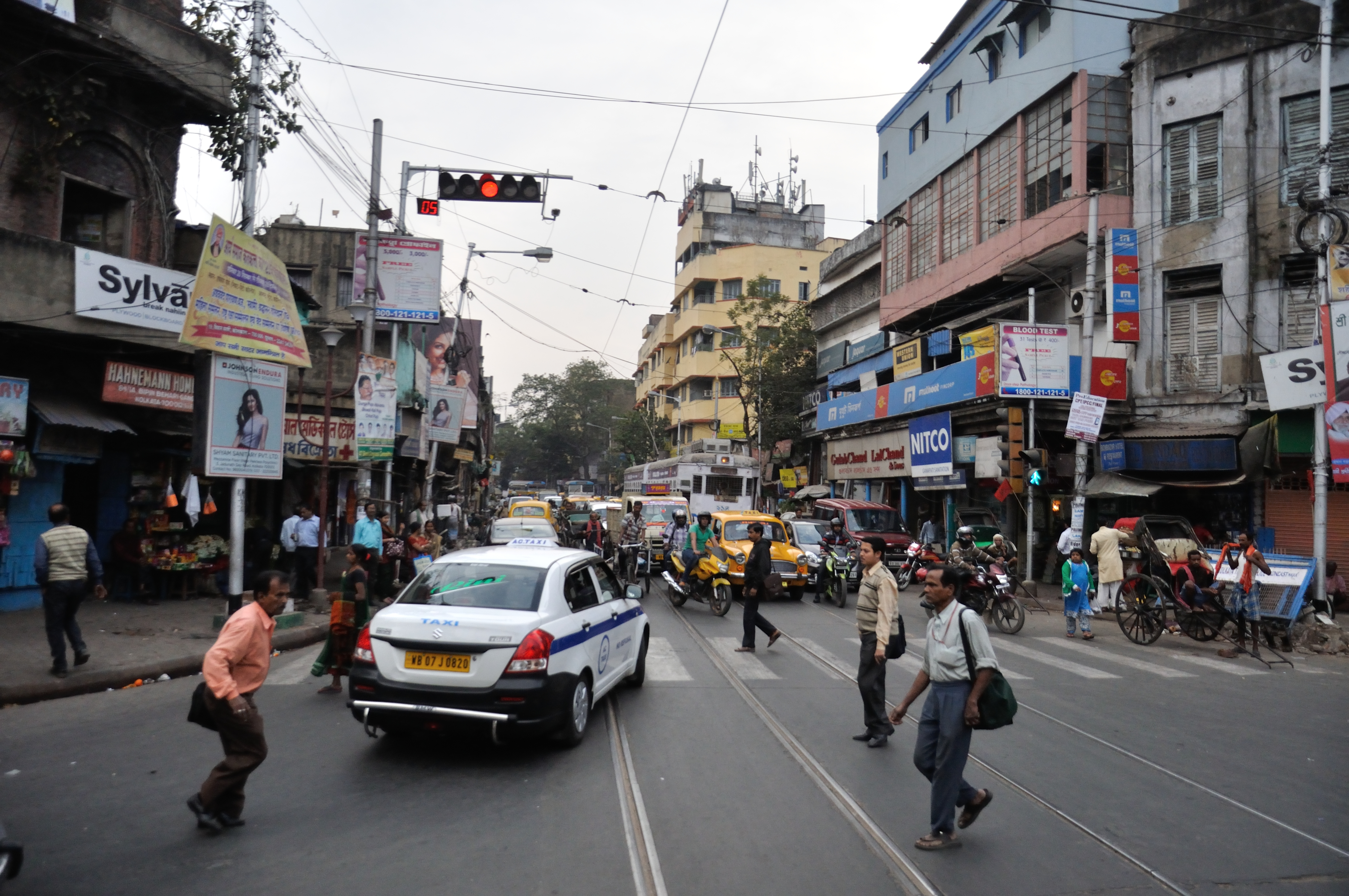
B.B. Ganguly Street and Nirmal Chandra Street Junction

== In news ==
During July 2019, as tunneling work of East West Metro Railway was being undertaken, due to unforeseen or faulty soil testing, a part of underground tunneling affected the lad character of the Bowbazaar area adjacent to BB Ganguly street. This caused problems for the gold merchants of B B Ganguly area as their shops were affected badly.

== See also ==
- Bowbazar, a neighbourhood in Kolkata, India
