= Chandni Chowk metro station (Kolkata) =

Metro station in Kolkata, India

Chandni Chowk
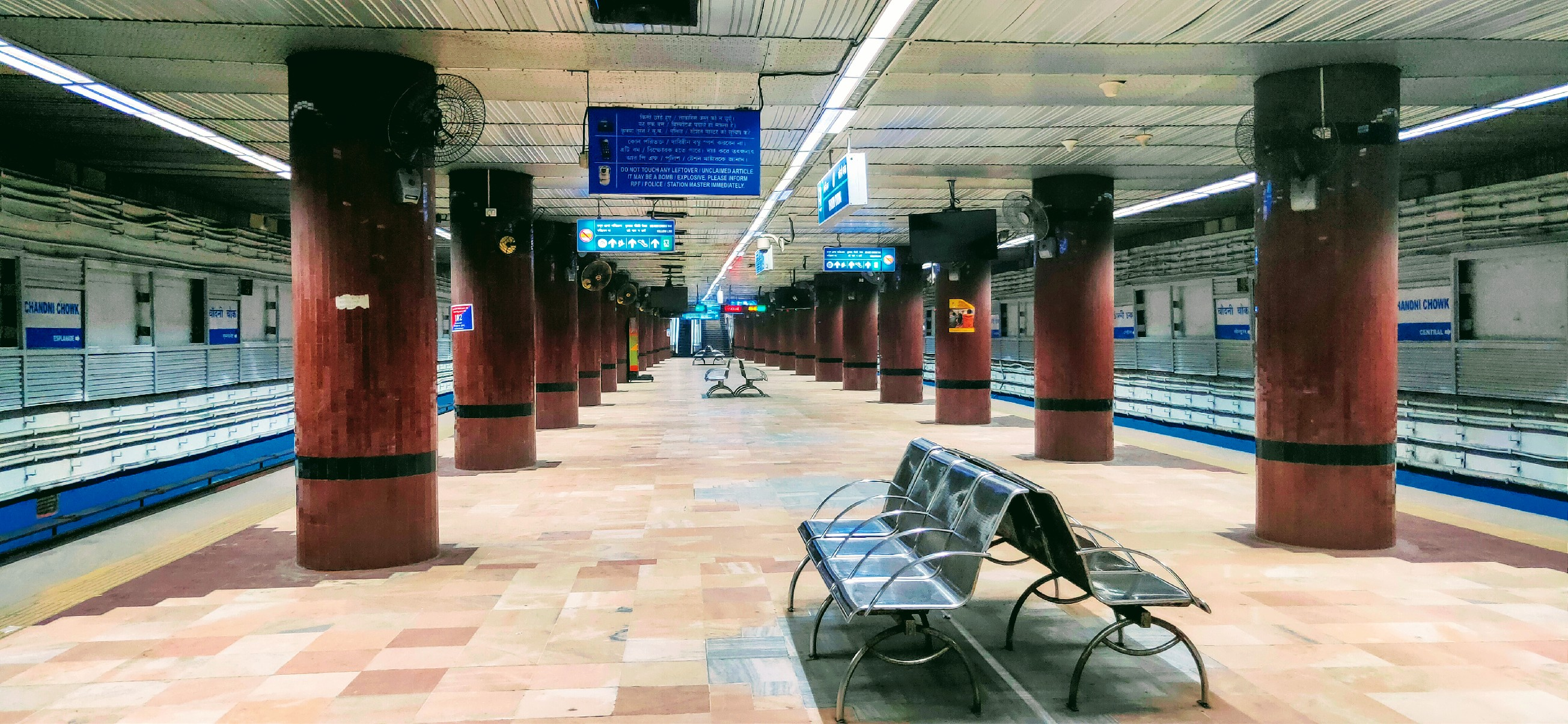
- Platform view of the station

General information
- Location: 12, Central Avenue; Chandni Chowk, Bowbazar; Kolkata, West Bengal 700072; India
- Coordinates: 22°34′01″N 88°21′15″E
- System: Kolkata Metro
- Operator: Metro Railway, Kolkata
- Line: Blue Line
- Platforms: 2 (1 island platform)

Construction
- Structure type: Underground
- Accessible: No

Other information
- Station code: KCWC

History
- Opened: 19 February 1995; 31 years ago

Services
Preceding station	Kolkata Metro	Following station
Central towards Dakshineswar	Blue Line	Esplanade towards Shahid Khudiram
Route map
Location

Chandni Chowk is an underground metro station on the North-South corridor of the Blue Line of Kolkata Metro in Kolkata, West Bengal, India. It is located in Central Avenue, Chandni Chowk, Bowbazar, Kolkata, West Bengal, India.

== Station Layout ==
G	Street level	Exit/Entrance
L1	Mezannine	Fare control, station agent, Ticket/token, shops, crossover
L2	Platform 2	Train towards Shahid Khudiram (Esplanade) →
L2	Island platform, Doors will open on the right
L2	Platform 1	← Train towards Dakshineswar (Central)

== Entry/Exit ==
- 1 - Hindustan Building
- 2 - India Coffee House
- 3 - Hind Cinema
- 4 - Yogayog Bhavan
- 5 - Indian Airlines
- 6 - Ganesh Chandra Avenue
Gate No.1 of the metro station

Gate No.2 of the metro station

Gate No.3 of the metro station

Gate No.4 of the metro station

Gate No.5 of the metro station

Gate No.6 of the metro station

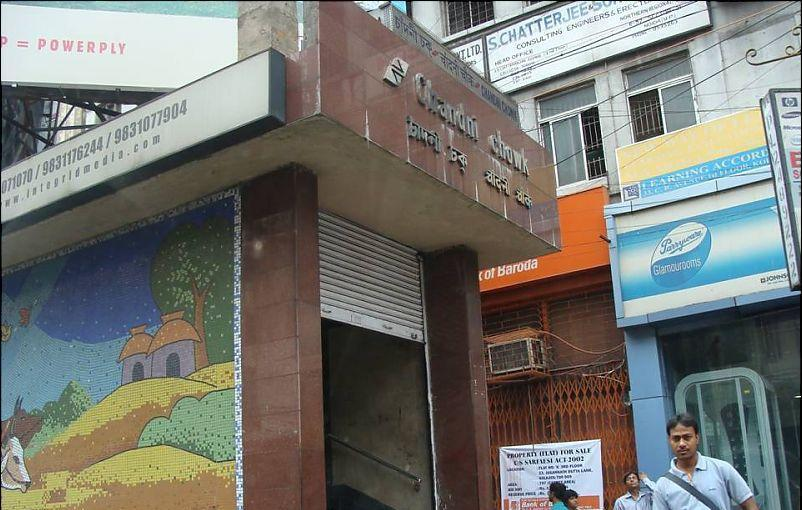
Chandni Chowk Metro Station Entrance in Kolkata, West Bengal

== Connections ==
=== Bus ===
Bus route number 3B, 30C, 47B, 78, 214, 214A, 237, 242, S139 (Mini), S160 (Mini), S161 (Mini), E25, S9A, S10, S10A, S11, S15G, S17A, AC20, AC39 etc. serve the station.

== See also ==
- Kolkata
- List of Kolkata Metro stations
- Transport in Kolkata
- Kolkata Metro Rail Corporation
- Kolkata Suburban Railway
- Kolkata Monorail
- Trams in Kolkata
- Bhowanipore
- Chowringhee Road
- List of rapid transit systems
- List of metro systems
