= Rodda company arms heist =

1914 robbery in Calcutta, British India

The Rodda company arms heist took place on 26 August 1914 in Calcutta, British India. Members of the Jugantar faction of the Bengali revolutionary organisation Anushilan Samiti intercepted a shipment of Mauser Pistols and ammunition belonging to Messrs Rodda & co., a Calcutta gun dealer, while these were en route from the Customs house to the company's godown, and were able to make away with a portion the arms. The heist was a sensational incident, being described by The Statesman as the "Greatest daylight robbery". In the following years, the pistols and ammunitions were linked to almost all the instances of nationalist struggles in Bengal. By 1922, the police had recovered most of the stolen arms.

== Background ==
Western Anushilan Samiti in the aftermath of Manicktala Conspiracy found more prominent leader in Jatindra Nath Mukherjee which emerged distinctly as the Jugantar group. Meanwhile, Rash Behari Bose, described later as "the most dangerous revolutionary in India" extended the groups reach into north India, where he found work in the Indian Forest Institute in Dehra Dun. Mukherjee took over the leadership of the secret society to be known as the Jugantar Party. He revitalised the links between the central organisation in Calcutta and its several branches spread all over Bengal, Bihar, Orissa and several places in U.P., and opened hideouts in the Sundarbans for members who had gone underground The group slowly reorganised guided by Mukherjee's efforts, aided by an emerging leadership which included Amarendra Chatterjee, Naren Bhattacharya and other younger leaders. In the aftermath of the Howrah-Sibpur Conspiracy case, Jatin and the leadership of Jugantar formulated their course of action to destabilise the Raj. Through the next two years, the organisation operated under the covers of two seemingly detached organisations, Sramajeebi Samabaya (The Labourer's Cooperative) and Harry & Sons. At around this time, Jatin began attempts to establish contacts with the 10th Jat Regiment then garrisoned at Fort William in Calcutta. Narendra Nath carried out through this time a number of robberies to obtain funds. In 1912, Jatin met in the company of Naren Bhattacharya the Crown Prince of Germany during the latter's visit to Calcutta, and obtained an assurance that arms and ammunition would be supplied to them. With the clouds of war gathering in Europe, plans were emerging of a pan-Indian revolution with German help. Rash Behari attempted to coordinate with expatriate Indian groups from USA and Canada, planning for a coordinated uprising in February 1915. Jatin was intimated of Rash Behari's work through Niralamba Swami while on a pilgrimage to the holy Hindu city of Brindavan. Returning to Bengal, Jatin began reorganising his group. Rash Behari had gone into hiding in Benares after the 1912 attempt on Hardinge, but he met Jatin towards the end of 1913, outlining the prospects of a pan-Indian revolution. Jugantar raised finances by robberies, carrying out a number of sensational raids on wealthy Bengali families. Now, more desperately than ever, Jugantar required arms.

== Heist ==
Rodda & Co. was a prominent British-owned gun store situated at the time in Vansittart Row in Calcutta. Among its employees was Shrish Chandra Mitra alias Habu, an active member of Anushilan. Mitra was aware of a major consignment of arms and ammunitions being shipped to the firm in August 1914. Informed of the impending arrival, a group of Jugantar members headed by Anukul Mukherjee met on 24 August 1914 in Bowbazar suburb of Calcutta. Among those present in the meeting was Naren Bhattacharya, who dissented from the plan and left. 26 August was fixed as the date of the heist.

On the day of the 26th, Mitra headed to the Customs house in Calcutta to receive the shipment on behalf of Rodda & Co. With him were seven bullock carts. Haridas Dutta, another member of a branch of Jugantar called Mukti Sangha, was dressed as the cart-driver for one of the carts Mitra took with him. Of the total of 202 boxes received by Mitra, 192 were loaded between the first six carts, while the remaining 10 boxes were taken to the Dutta's cart. Walking along with Dutta's cart were two other revolutionaries Srish Pal and Khagendra Nath Das. On exiting Customs house with his cargo, Mitra led his convoy while Dutta's cart was last. As the rest of the train headed for the company's godown, The trio of Dutta, Pal and Das broke off and headed to Mononga lane suburb of Calcutta via Mission row. The successful heist handed Jugantar 50 Mauser pistols and 46,000 rounds of ammunition.

== Aftermath ==
The news of the arms heist became sensational. The Statesman, in its edition on 30 August 1914 described the heist as "The greatest daylight robbery". Haridas Dutta was arrested in September 1914, and served prison sentences for his role in the heist, along with Kalidas Basu, Bhujanga Dhar and Girindranath Banerjee. In the following years, these arms were linked to the majority of revolutionary crimes in Calcutta and Bengal till 1917, including Bagha Jatin during his last stand at the banks of Budhabalanga River. By 1922, the police had recovered most of the stolen arms.

== Commemoration ==
Mukherjee, the planner of the heist, along with Bannerjee, Dutta, and Bipin Bihary Ganguly are commemorated in Calcutta today, with a memorial and their statues of their busts erected in Ganesh Chandra Avenue.
