= Firingi Kalibari =

Hindu temple dedicated to goddess Kali in Kolkata, India

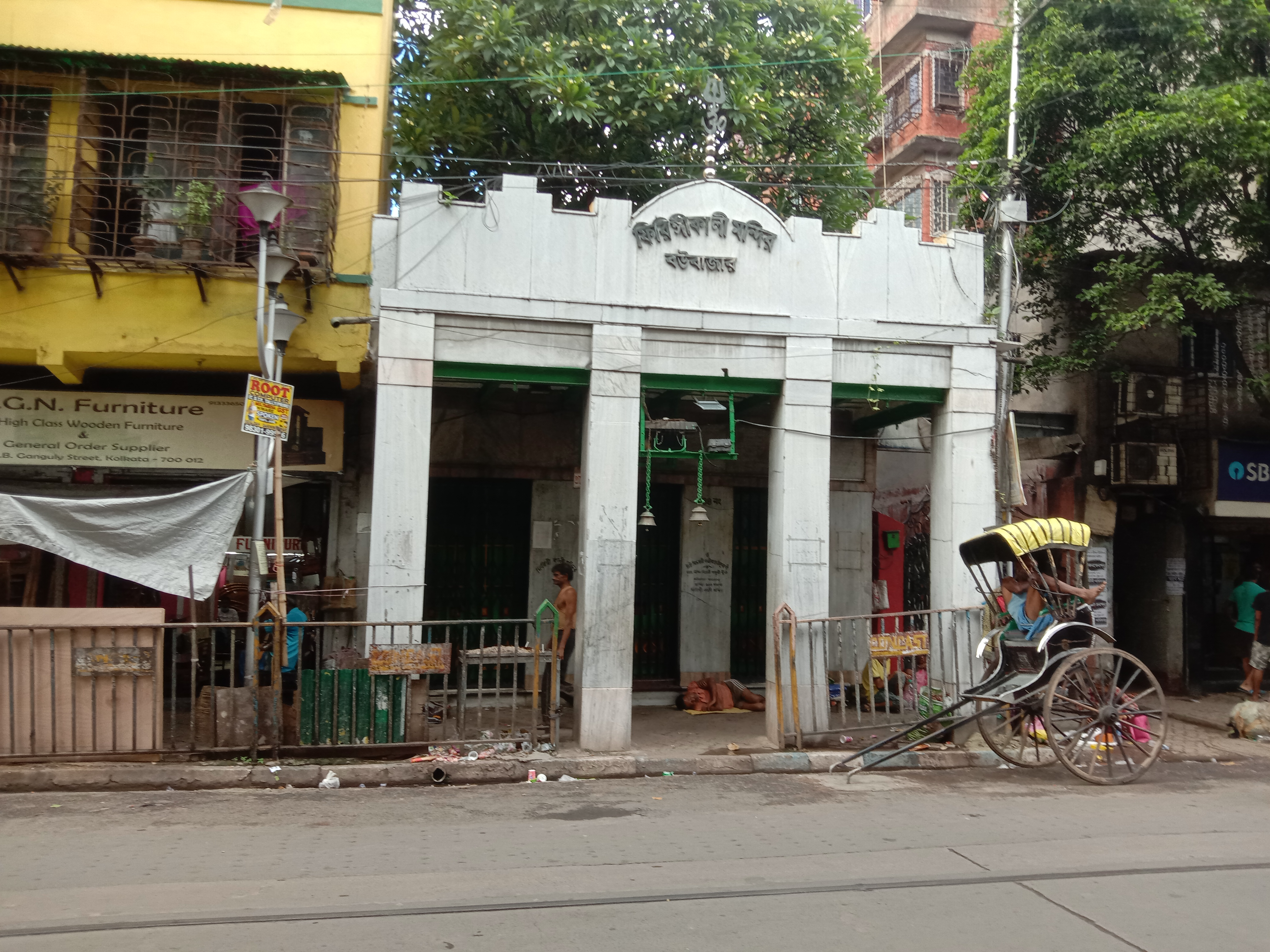
- Firingi Kalibari in Bowbazar, July 2022

Religion
- Affiliation: Hinduism
- District: Kolkata
- Deity: Goddess Kali: Kali Puja; Kartik Amavasya; Kaushiki Amavasya; Phalaharini Amavasya

Location
- Location: Kolkata
- State: West Bengal
- Country: India

Architecture
- Temple: 1

Website
- firinghikalibari.com

Firingi Kalibari is a temple dedicated to the Hindu Goddess Kali located on B.B. Ganguly Street in Bowbazar locality of Kolkata, West Bengal, India. The temple is said to be over 200 years old and is named after its association with Anthony Firingee (1786–1839), a European who converted to Hinduism and was a great devotee of Kali.

One of the oldest Kali temples in Kolkata, Maa Kali is worshipped here in the form of "Maa Siddheshwari". Hundreds of devotees gather at the temple for worship on the occasions of Kali Puja, Kaushiki Amavasya and Phalaharini Amavasya.

== History ==
There are a number of legends and believes regarding the establishment of the temple. The most popular one is linked to the association of Anthony Firingee with the temple with. A European who converted to Hinduism after marrying a widowed Hindu lady and being influenced by the Hindu culture, the temple derived its prefix "Firingi" from his name. From that, the deity of Maa Kali is also sometimes known as "Firingi Kali".

But the thing to be noted is, no historical proof of Anthony Firingee being associated with the temple has been found. Historian Radharaman Mitra in his book "Kolkata Darpan" mentions that the association of Hensman Anthony with the temple is incorrect. Historians have mixed opinion regarding the establishment year of the temple. There is a date stone in the temple which mentions the temple was established in 905 AD, which means the temple is more than 525 years old. But many historians think it is not possible to construct a temple at that time because, there were no human settlements in this region during that time.

According to another story from the book of Sir Harry Evan Cotton, which most historians believe, the temple was established by Dom Srimanta as a Shiv Mandir, in a small house on a shmashana, located inside the dense forests of that region. Later he also started worshipping Maa Shitala. It was located close to the Bhagirathi river. Since the temple was established by a Dom, no priests went to the temple. Hence, Srimanta himself worshipped the deities.

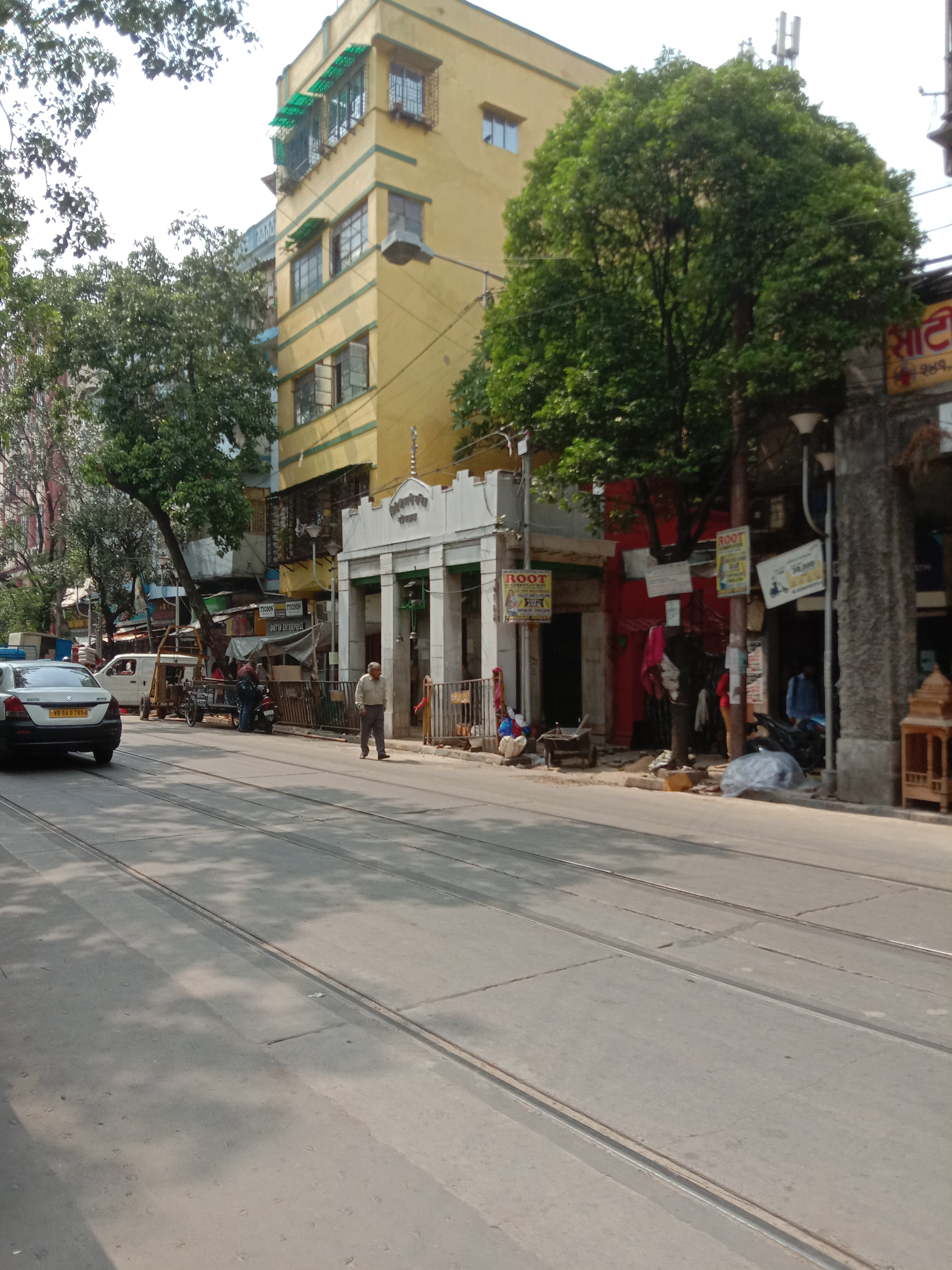
Firinghi Kalibari at B.B. Ganguly Street in Bowbazar, Kolkata, May 2022.

Behind the temple was Hensman Anthony's maternal uncle's house. Sometimes he used to come to the temple while visiting his maternal uncle's house and sang hymns to the deities. One time he sang "Bhajan pujan jani ne maa, jatete firingi. Jadi daya kore kripa koro, hey Shiva Matangi." It is said that he did small renovations to the temple after getting swapnadesh from Maa Kali herself.

Whether Srimanta himself established the Maa Kali's idol in the temple or it was established by Anthony is unclear. But according to some sources, it was built by Anthony after "swapnadesh" from Maa Kali. Many English and Portuguese people used to live in this region (Locally known as the "firingi sahebs"). They sometimes worshipped at the temple, hoping a bloom in their business. When they were affected with chickenpox, many of them were treated and cured by Srimanta. As a sign to express their gratitude, they offered puja at the temple and from that time, the temple could have received its prefix "Firingi".

Over time, the temple came to the hands of a Bandopadhyay family of Kolkata. They have worshipped the deities and taken care of the temple since generations. According to the info given by present sevayets, the temple was received by their ancestors in 1880 AD. As Srimanta did not have any successor, he sold the temple to Shashibhusan Bandopadhyay for ₹60 rupees. Once upon a time, although animal sacrifices was performed, it is not practised today.

== Deities worshipped ==
The temple is made from moonstones of silvery-white colour. Maa Siddheswari's idol is three-eyed and has a height of about five-and-a-half feet. Maa Kali here is worshipped as "Maa Siddheswari". The idol is placed in a "panchamundi ashan" and faced towards the south direction. Initially the idol was made of clay but now it is made of concrete. Besides Maa Siddheswari Kali, there are idols of Maa Durga and Maa Jagaddhatri made from "ashtadhatu". There are idols of Maa Shitala and Maa Manasha too. There is also a "Narayan Shila" to worship Lord Vishnu and a Shiv Lingam dedicated to Lord Shiva.

== Rituals and prasad ==
Over the last century, the temple is managed and the deities are worshipped by descendants of the Banerjee family. Every day, the deities are worshipped with fruit and sweet offerings, while "anna bhog" is offered twice a month. Special puja is offered on the amavasyas every month. On purnimas, Narayan Puja takes place. On "Kartik Amavasya", the temple registers the highest number of devotees. It takes place akin to an annual celebration and "pujapath" occurs throughout the day.
