= Srish Pal =

Bengali revolutionary (1887-1939)

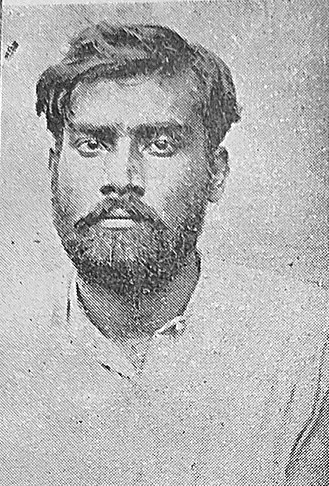
- revolutionary Srish Pal
- Born: c. 1887; Mulbarga, Dacca, British India
- Died: 13 April 1939; British India
- Other name: Naren
- Occupation: Revolutionary
- Organization: Mukti Sangha (later Bengal Volunteers)
- Known for: Rodda Company Arms Heist
- Movement: Indian independence movement

Srish Pal (c. 1887 – 13 April 1939) was a Bengali revolutionary, born in Mulbarga, Dacca, British India. His full name was Shrish Chandra Pal. He was drawn to revolutionary politics in 1905 under the guidance of Hemchandra Ghosh. He joined the Dhaka-based Mukti Sangha (later known as Bengal Volunteers). Pal was a follower of Subhas Chandra Bose. Pal played a central role in planning and executing the Rodda Company Arms Heist in August 1914, which involved stealing 50 Mauser pistols and 46,000 cartridges from Rodda & Co., a British arms dealer in Kolkata. He was also involved in the assassination of police officer Nandalal Banerjee.

Historian Uma Mukherjee, in her book, Two Great Indian Revolutionaries (1966), described Srish Pal as the "chief actor" in the Rodda Conspiracy.

== Nandalal murder ==
After the arrest and death of Prafulla Chaki, the senior revolutionary leaders decided to assassinate Nandalal Banerjee, the infamous police inspector responsible for Prafulla's arrest. Pal, along with Ranen Ganguly, a member of Atmonnati Samiti, succeeded in the mission. They killed Nandalal on November 9, 1908, in Serpentine Lane, Kolkata and fled.

== Rodda arms robbery ==
Shrish Pal participated in the Rodda company arms heist. On 26 August 1914, a group of Bengali revolutionaries stole several Mauser pistols and cartridges from the Kidderpore Dock area. The entire operation was led by Shrish Chandra Mitra, alias Habu. Pal, Khagendra Nath Das, and Haridas Dutta secured the arms in a discreet manner. Finally, the police arrested Shrish Pal in 1916 but could not prove his involvement in the Nandalal Banerjee murder case. He was released from jail in 1919 due to severe illness

== Death ==
Shrish Pal died on 13 April 1939.
