= Shrish Chandra Mitra =

Bengali revolutionary

Srish Chandra Mitra (death: 1915?) or Habu was a Bengali revolutionary and active member of Indian independence movement.

== Revolutionary activities ==
Mitra was born in Raspur village, Amta, Howrah district. He was popularly known as Habu Mitra. He joined in Anushilan Samiti and entered in British gun maker Rodda Company as an employee. Mitra was aware of a major consignment of arms and ammunition being shipped to the Company in August 1914 and planned to loot the arms for revolutionaries. On 26 August, he headed to the Customs house in Kolkata to receive the shipment on behalf of Rodda & Co. With him were seven Bullock carts. Haridas Dutta, a member of Jugantar was dressed as the cart-driver for one of the carts Mitra took with him. Total of 202 boxes received by Mitra, Srishh Pal and Khagendra Nath Das assisted him to reach those ammunition towards Mononga Lane via Mission row. British police described that Mitra was the mastermind of the Rodda company arms heist. The Statesman, in its edition on 30 August 1914 described the heist as 'The greatest daylight robbery'.

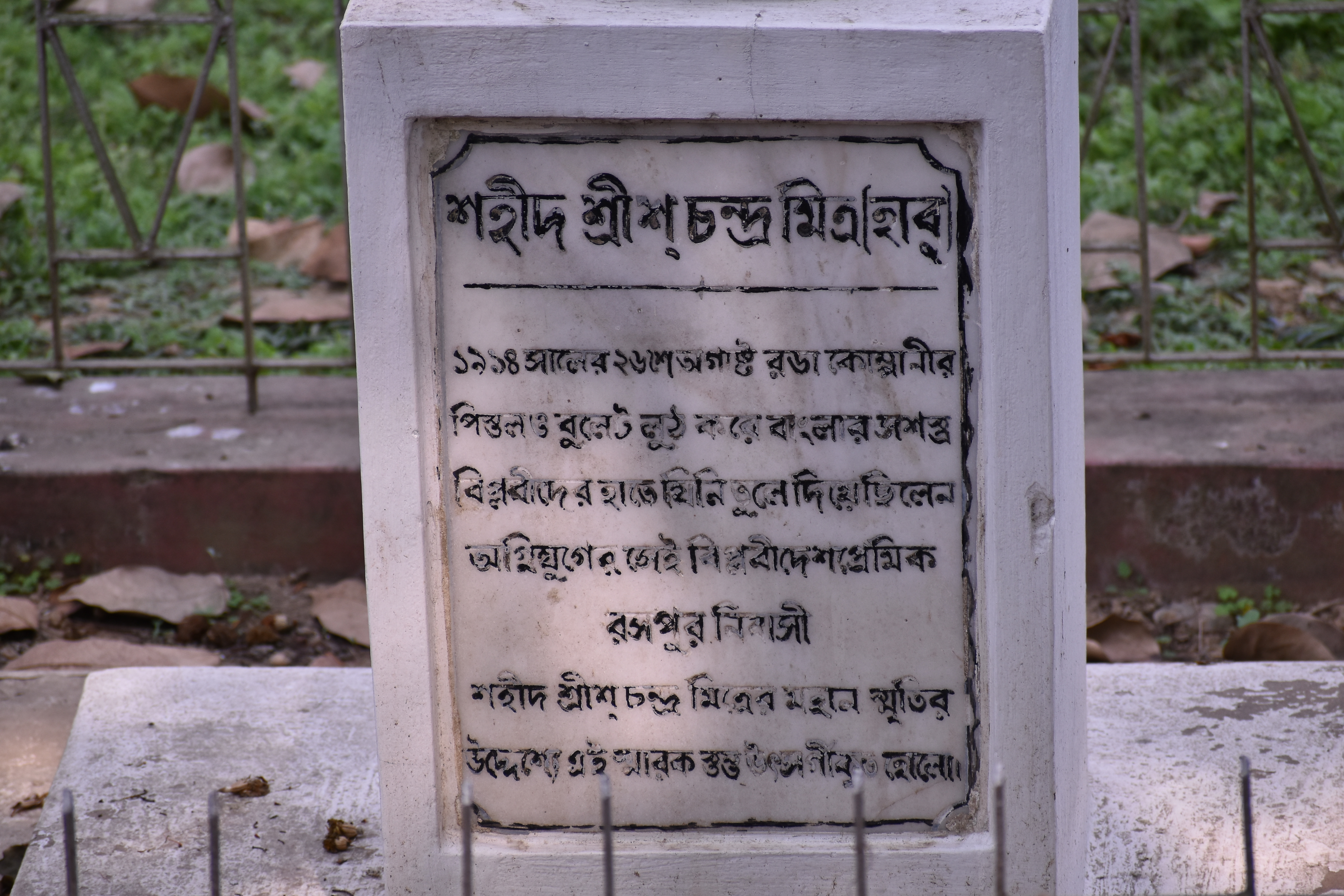
The Martyr Memorial, built at Raspur village in memory of Shrish Chandra Mitra

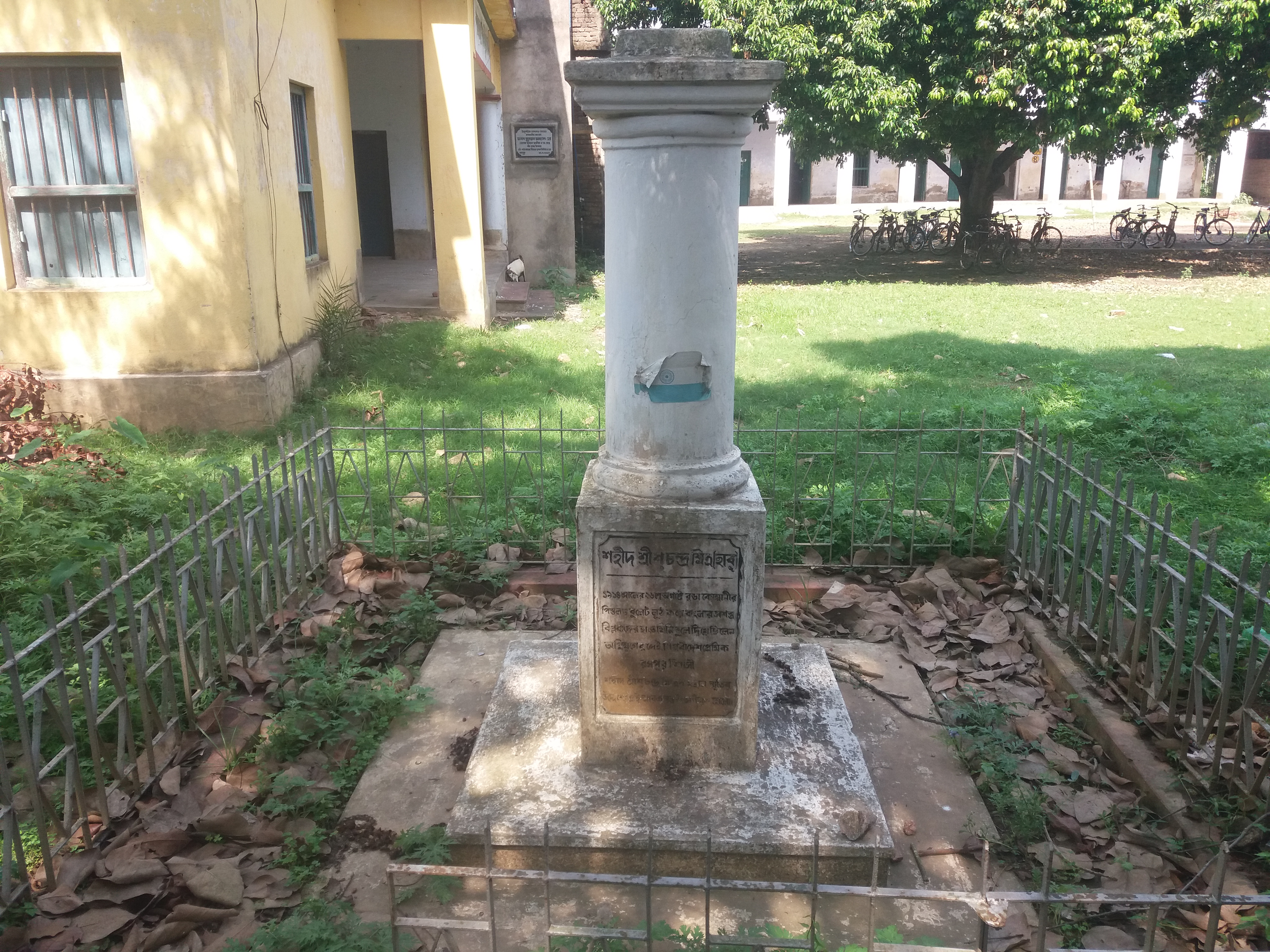
The Martyr Memorial, built at Raspur village in memory of Shrish Chandra Mitra

== Death ==
He remained underground as per the instruction of the Anushilan Samiti and went to North East India to avoid arrest. Possibly in 1915 Mitra decided to go to China by road that passing through the jungles but could not succeed to cross the border and shot dead by frontier guards.
