= Bowbazar =

- Neighborhood of Kolkata
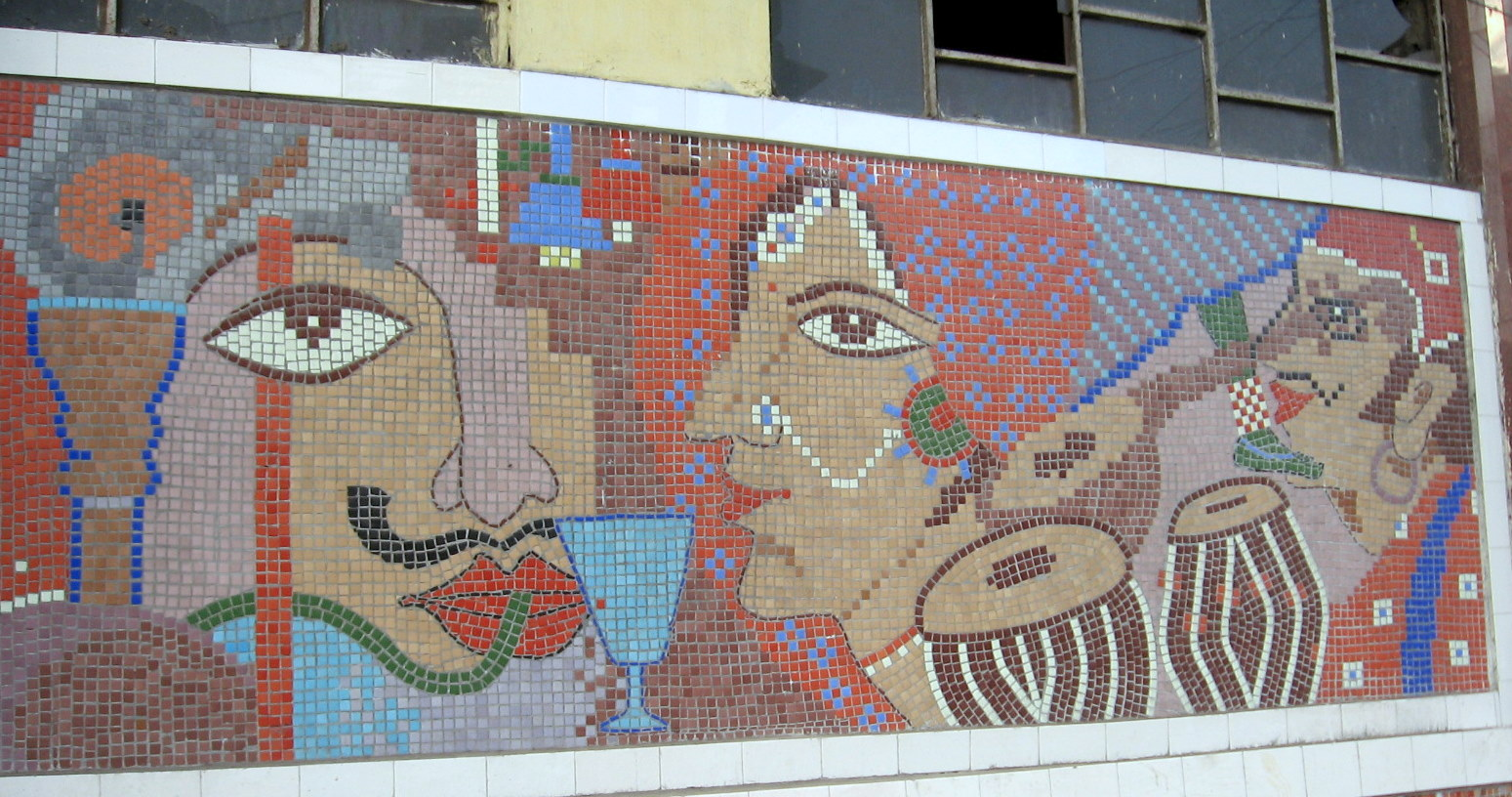
- Ceramic mural on the wall of Central Station, Kolkata Metro, located on B.B. Ganguly Street

- Location in Kolkata
- Coordinates: 22.5687°N 88.3632°E
- Country: India
- State: West Bengal
- City: Kolkata
- District: Kolkata
- Metro Station: Chandni Chowk, Central, Mahakaran and Sealdah
- Railway station: Sealdah
- Municipal Corporation: Kolkata Municipal Corporation
- KMC wards: 46, 47, 48, 49, 50, 51
- Elevation: 36 ft (11 m)
- Time zone: UTC+5:30 (IST)
- PIN: 700012, 700072
- Area code: +91 33
- Lok Sabha constituency: Kolkata Uttar
- Vidhan Sabha constituency: Chowranghee

Bowbazar (also spelt Boubazar; formerly known as Bahubazar) is a neighbourhood of Central Kolkata, in Kolkata district in the Indian state of West Bengal.

== History ==
On Lt. Col. Mark Wood's map of 1784, the portion of the eastward road from Lal Bazar to what was known for a long time as Circular Road - which ran along the filled-in Maratha Ditch and is now Acharya Jagadish Chandra Bose Road - was shown as Boytaconnah Street, which received its name from the Baithakkana, or "resting place", where merchants formed and dispersed their caravans, sheltered by an old banyan tree (called a peepul tree in Cotton), at the road's eastern extremity.

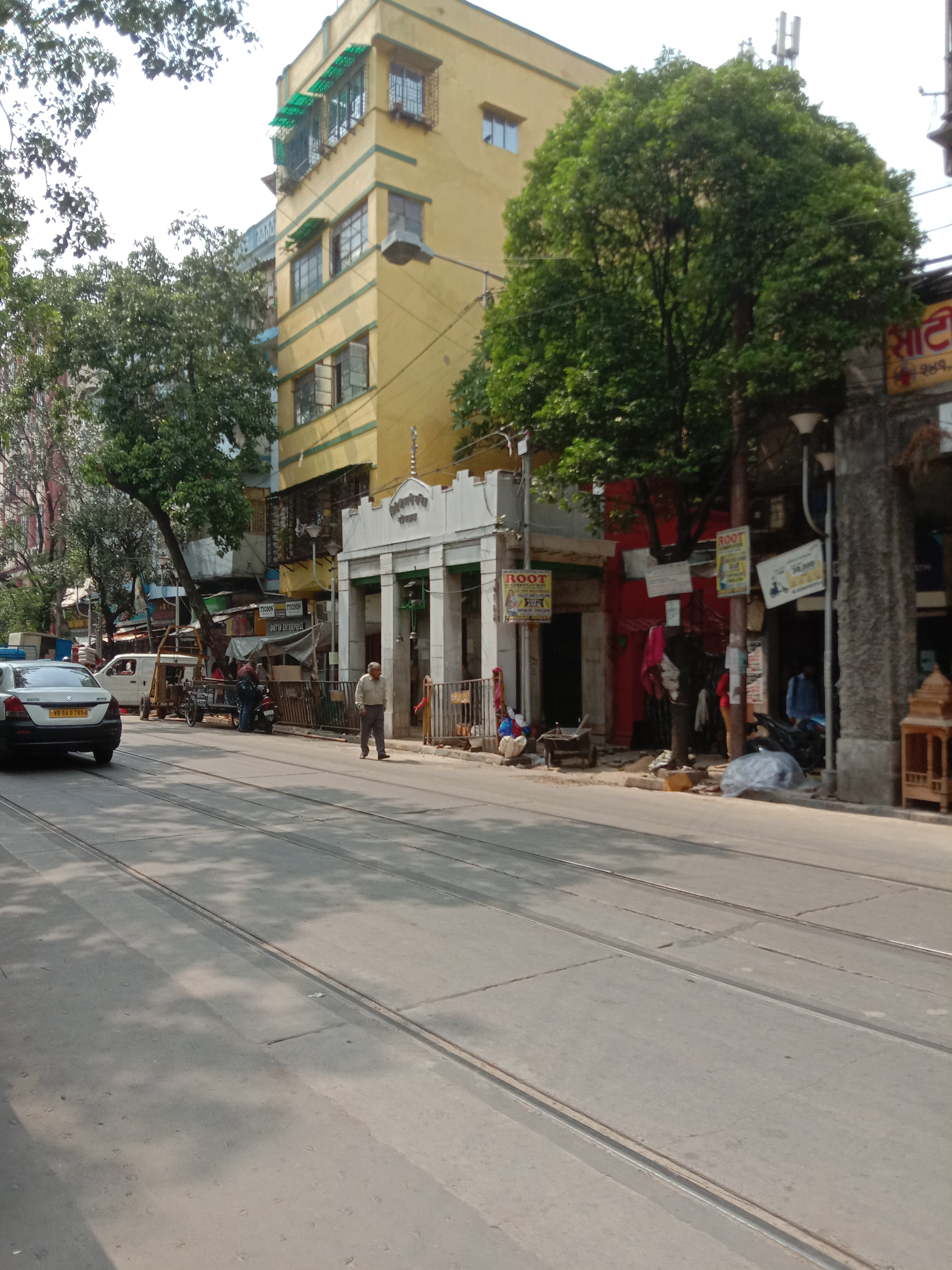
Firinghi Kalibari at B.B. Ganguly Street in Bowbazar, Kolkata, May 2022.

Bow Bazar Street has been renamed Bepin Behari Ganguly Street (named after Bipin Behari Ganguli (1887–1954), revolutionary leader, who spent about 24 years in British Indian jails, later joining the Congress movement). However, the locality continues to be called Bow Bazar. In keeping with the neighbourhood's earliest name, a road stretching from B.B. Ganguly Street to MG Road is called Baithakkhana Road, as well as the market along the road at the easternmost part of B.B. Ganguly Street being called Baithakkhana Bazar.

At the cross roads where Lal Bazar, Bow Bazar, Chitpore Road and Bentinck Street meet was the place of execution, where the pillory was.

In 1888, one of the 25 newly organized police section houses was located in Bowbazar.

== Geography ==
=== Police district ===
Bowbazar police station is part of the Central division of Kolkata Police. It is located at 13, Kapalitoalla Lane, Kolkata-700012.

Taltala Women police station covers all police districts under the jurisdiction of the Central division, i.e. Bowbazar, Burrabazar, Girish Park, Hare Street, Jorasanko, Muchipara, New Market, Taltala and Posta.

=== Red light district ===
Bowbazar has a red-light district where about 12,000 prostitutes work.

== Transport ==
Bowbazar is in the administrative and commercial heart of the city.

=== Road ===
Chittaranjan Avenue (C.R. Avenue) and College Street-Nirmal Chandra Street pass through the area from north to south. Bepin Behari Ganguly Street (B.B. Ganguly Street) and Dr. Lalit Banerjee Sarani-Khirode Vidya Binode Avenue (New CIT Road) pass through the area from east to west. Many buses ply along these roads.

=== Train ===
Sealdah Station and B.B.D Bag railway station are the nearest railway stations of Bowbazar.

== Economy ==
There are, as well, shops dealing in wooden furniture, musical instruments, shoes, seasonal fruits, fresh vegetables and meat, etc.

US-Bangla Airlines has its India offices in Bowbazar.

== Bowbazar bomb blast incident ==
Mohammad Rashid Khan, a satta don, bombed Bowbazar on 16 March 1993, which killed 69 people. He and five of his associates were sentenced to life imprisonment.

== Culture ==
Banga Natyalay, in nearby Pathuriaghata, was the first theatre to print admission cards in Bengali.

Traditionally, musical soirées were held in the large private houses of old Kolkata; but there also were some humbler houses that had similar soirées, amongst the latter being the Bowbazar home of a musical family, the Borals. The music maestro Jadu Bhatt, who gave musical lessons to the Tagores, died in Babu Ram Sil Lane, at the abode of the Adhikaris, which is also referred to as the Jhulan Bari. A festival of Indian classical music is still held there each year during Lord Krishna's festival of Jhulan Purnima.

Very old sweet shops, associated with the memories of Iswarchandra Vidyasagar and Sir Ashutosh Mukherjee, still exist in Bowbazar.

== Gallery ==
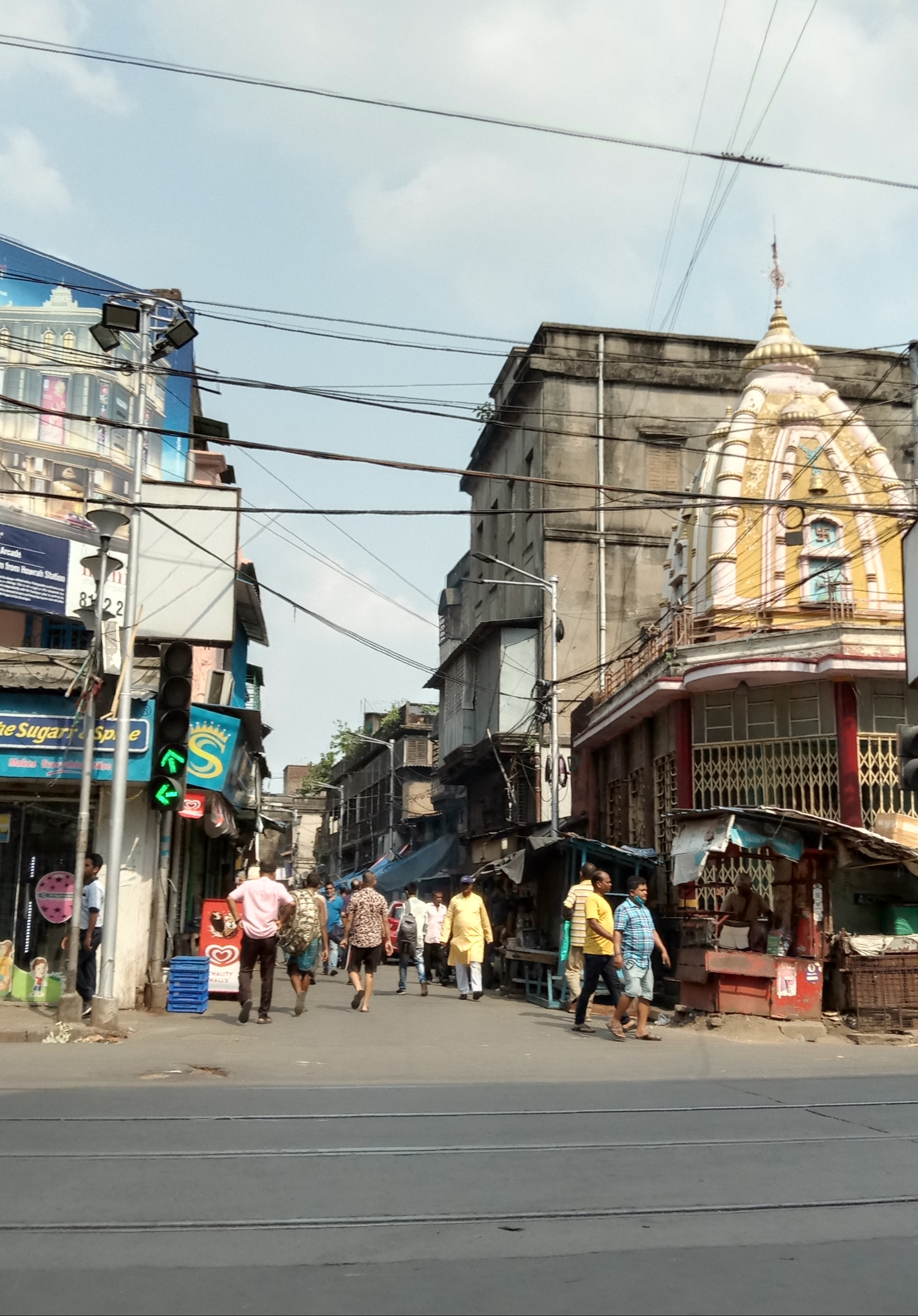
Bowbazar Shiv Mandir

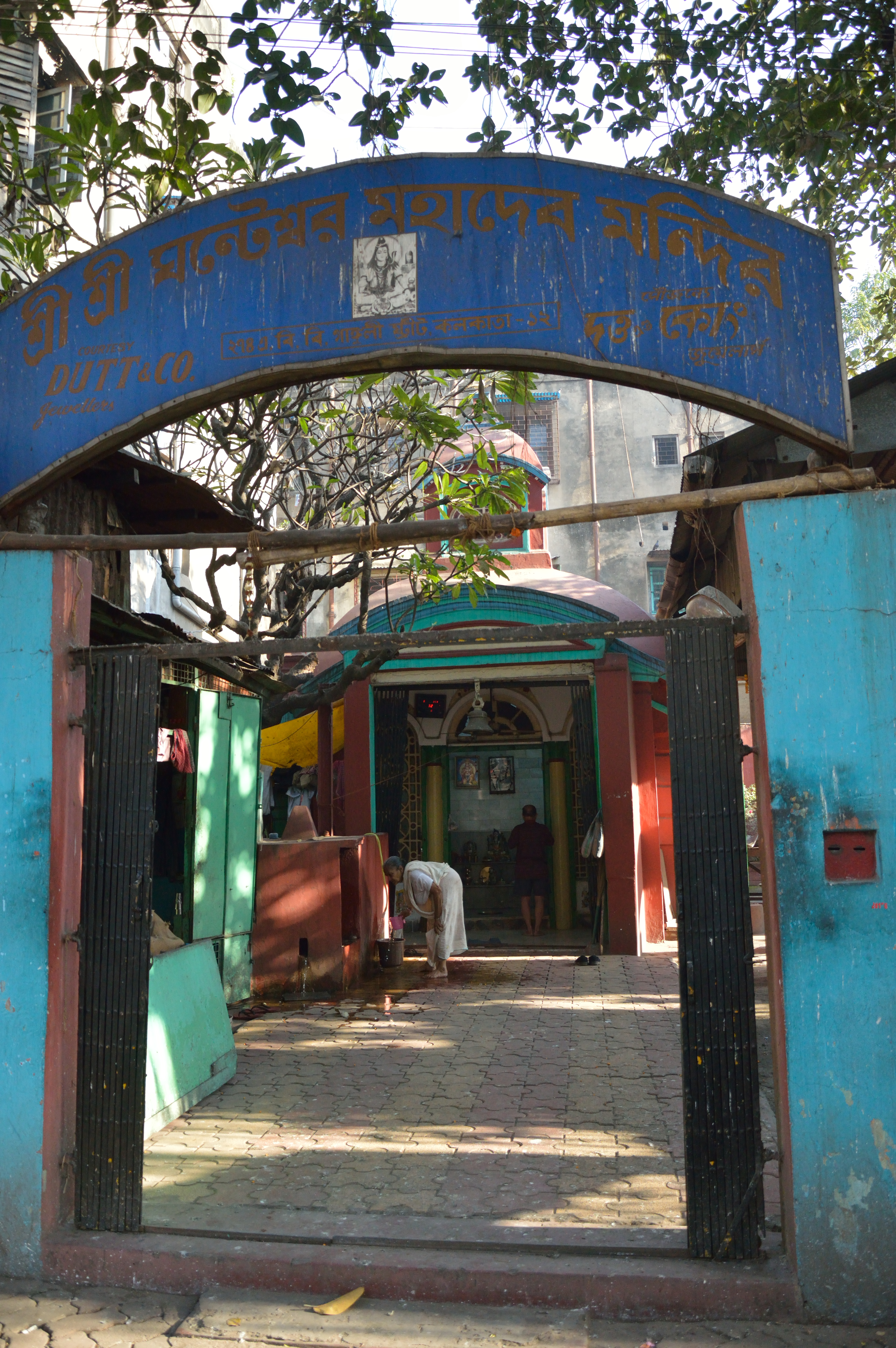
Ghanteshwar Mahadev Mandir

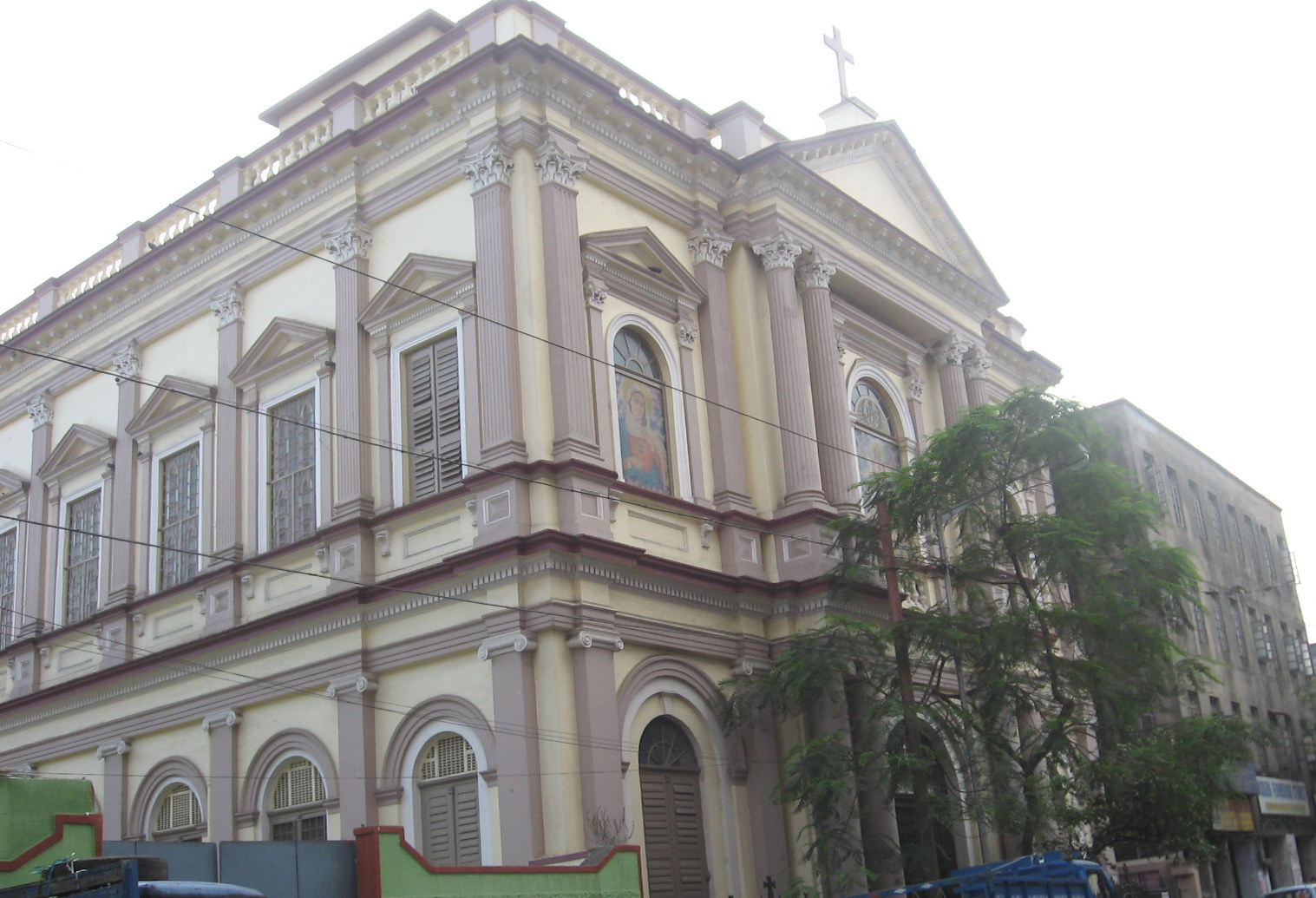
St. Francis Xavier Church

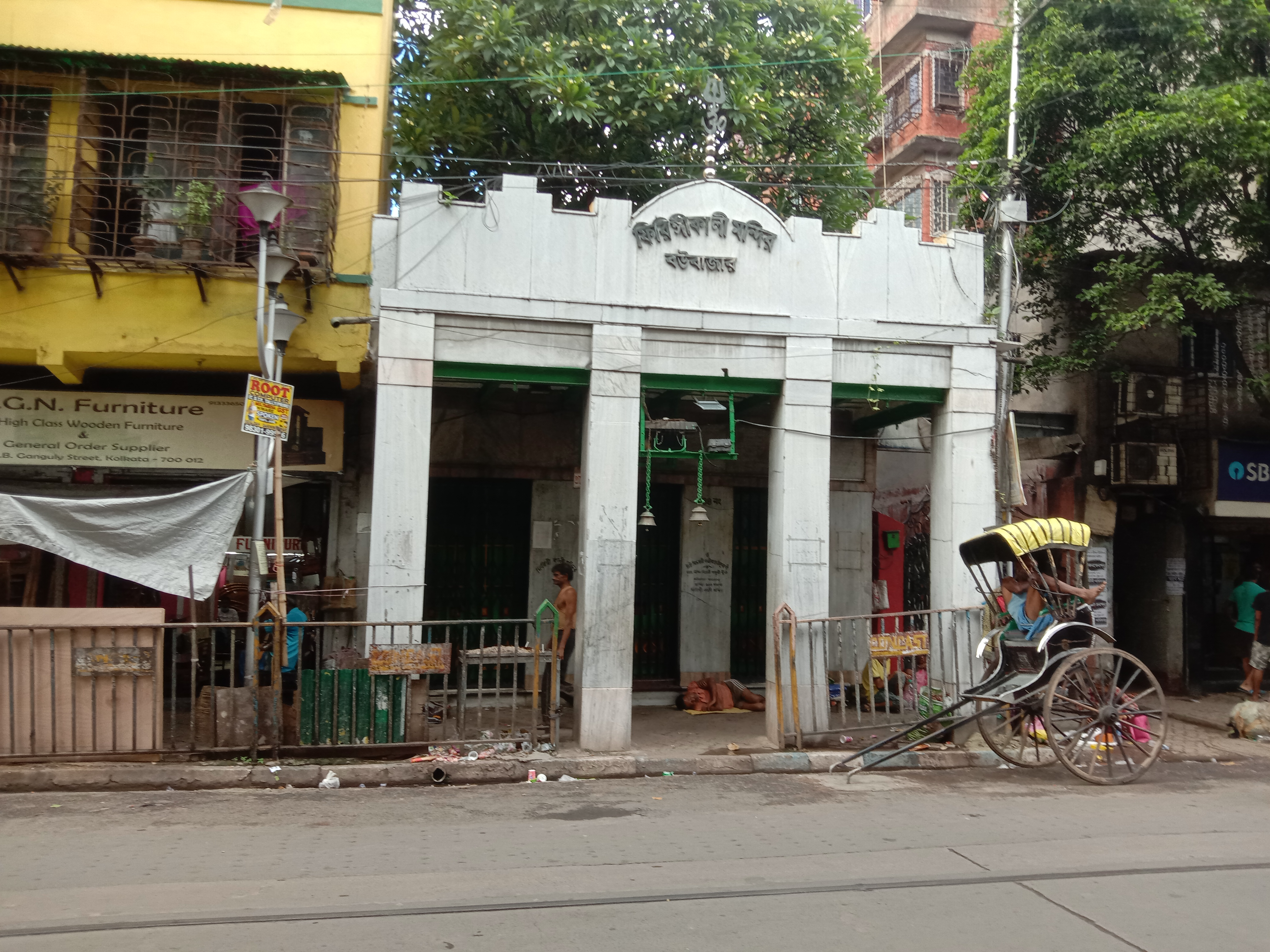
Firinghi Kalibari of Anthony Kabial fame

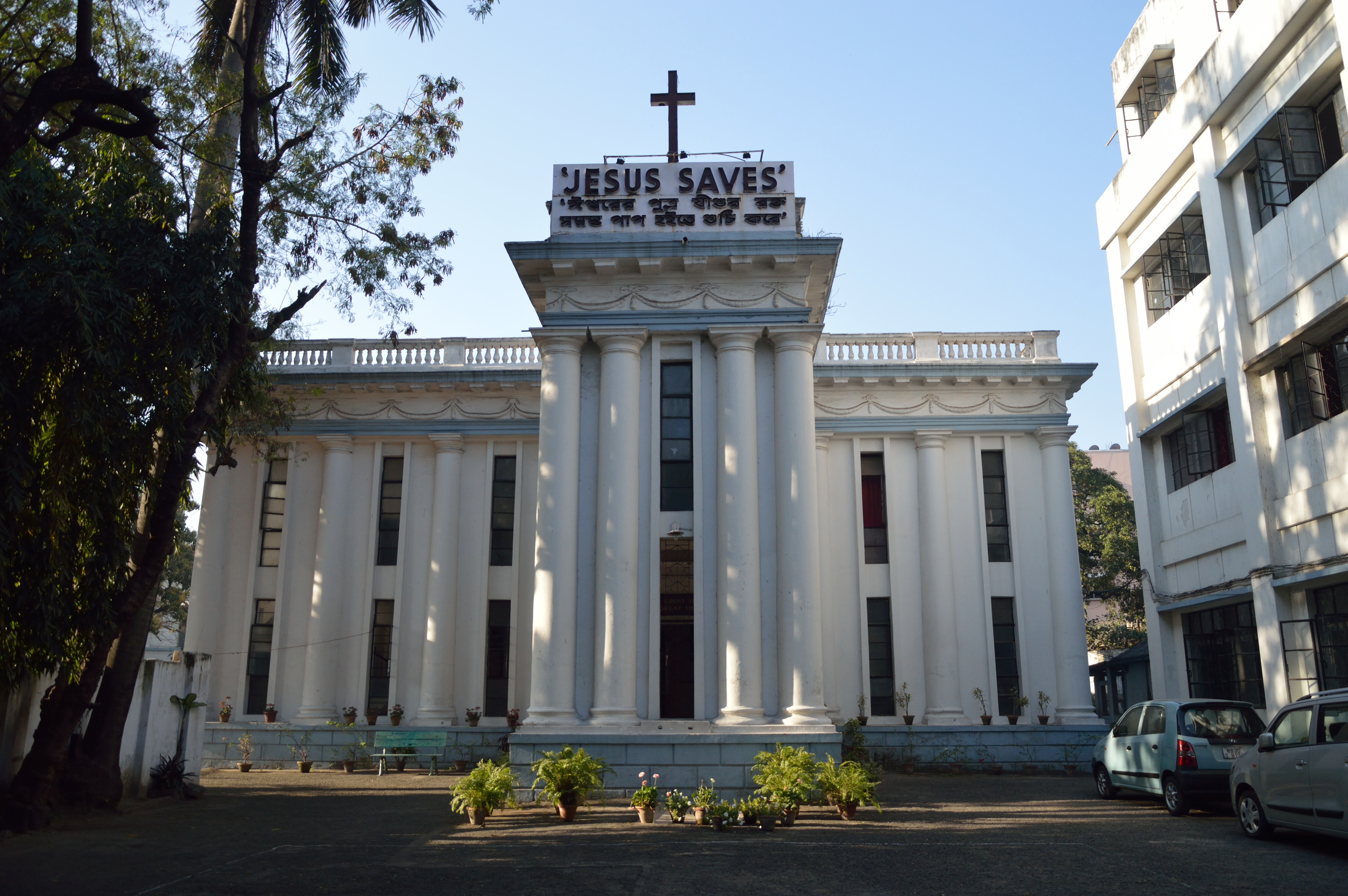
Carey Baptist Church

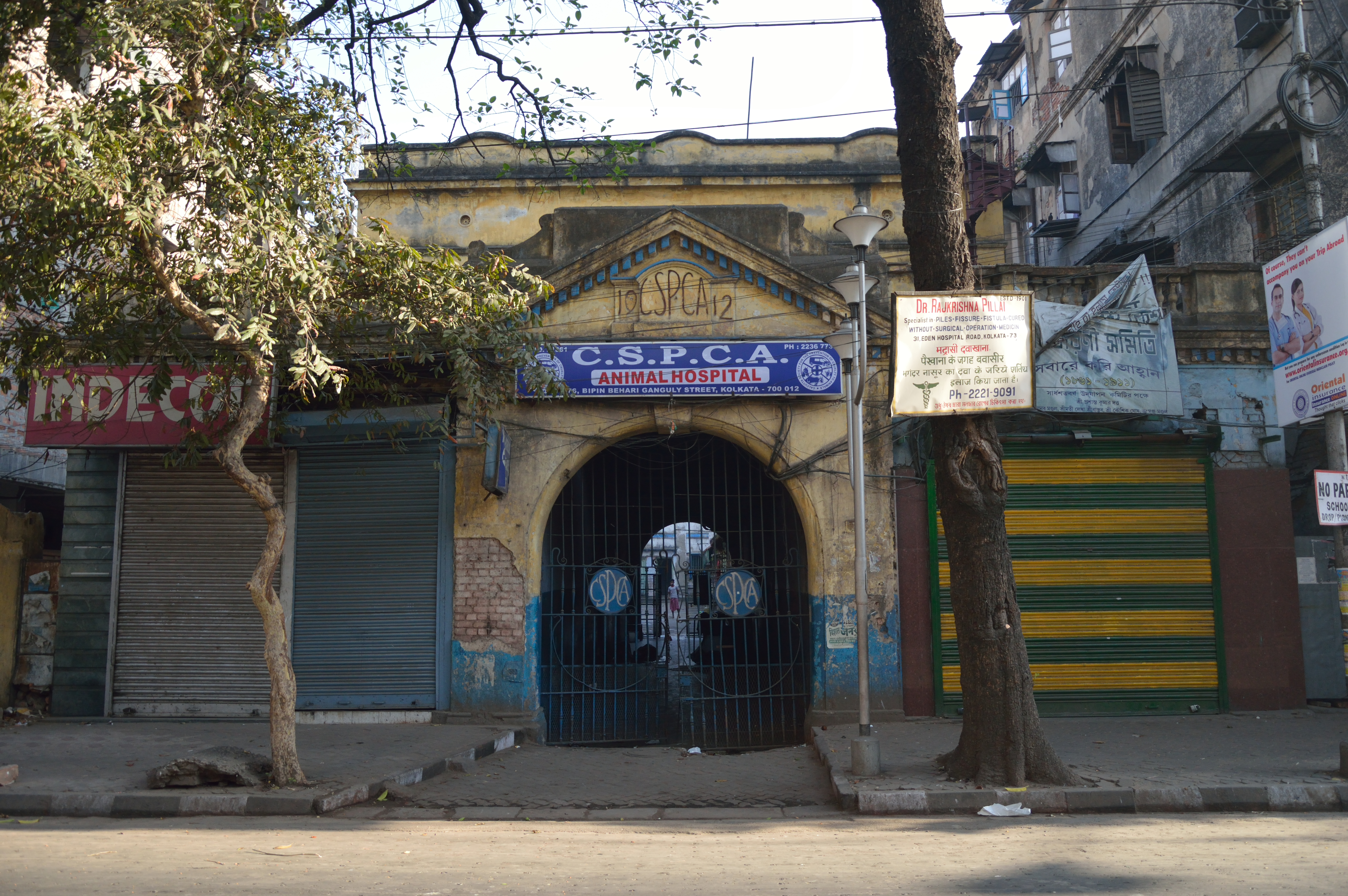
CSPCA - Animal Hospital

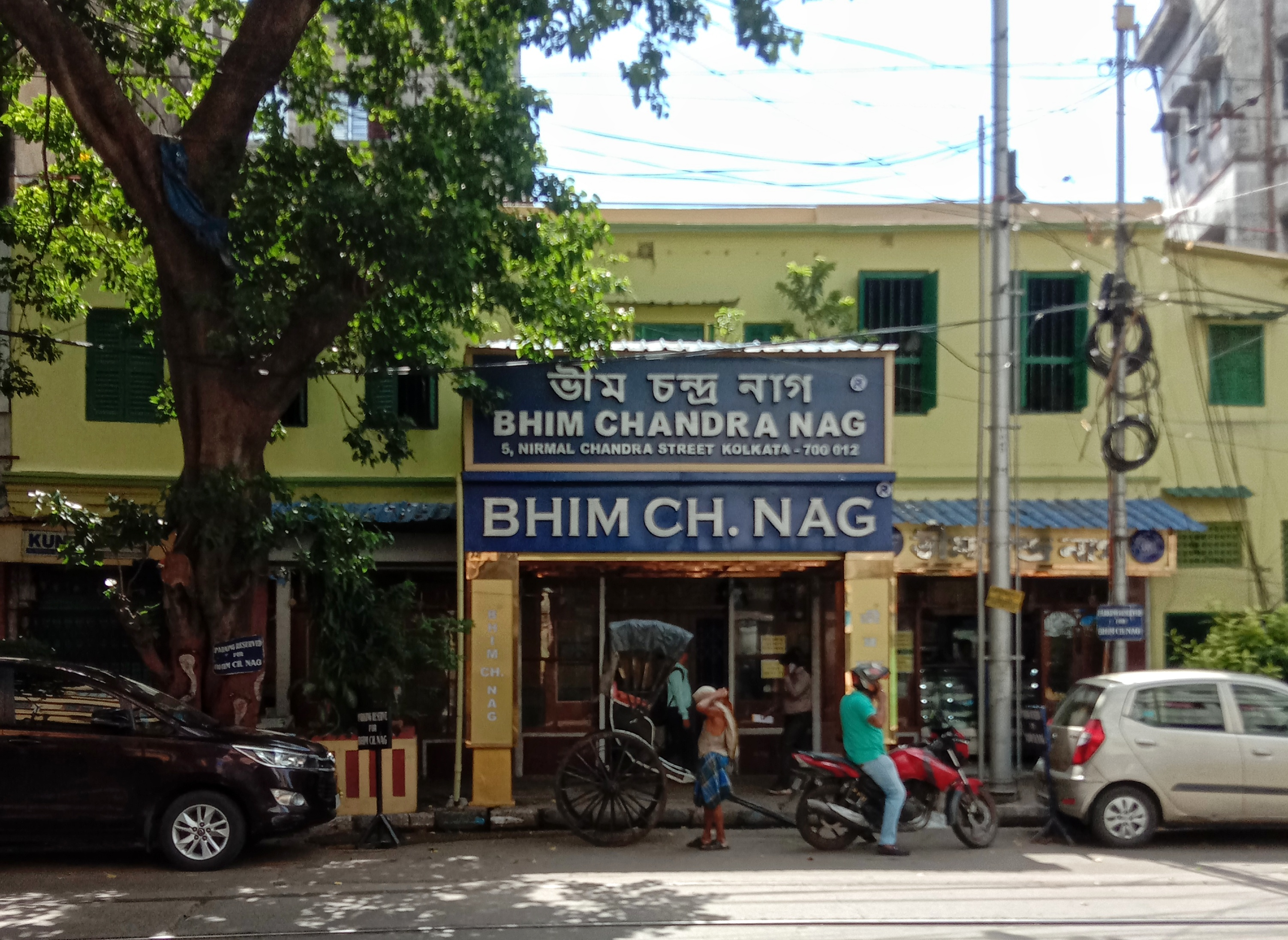
Bhim Chandra Nag, the prestigious sweet shop in Kolkata, set up by Paran Chandra Nag in 1826.

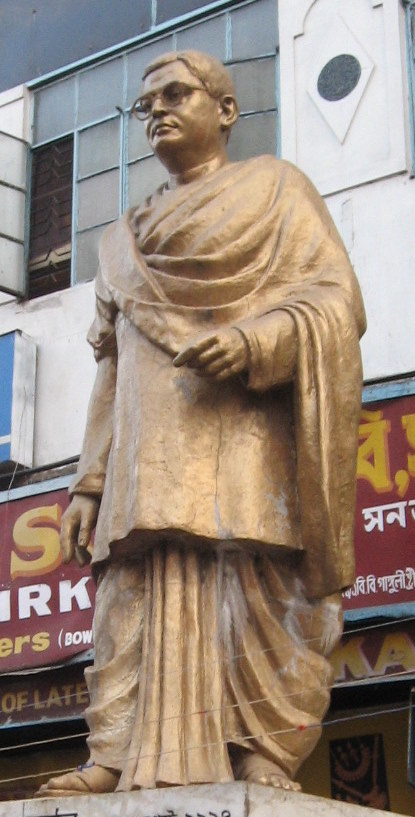
Statue of Bipin Behari Ganguli

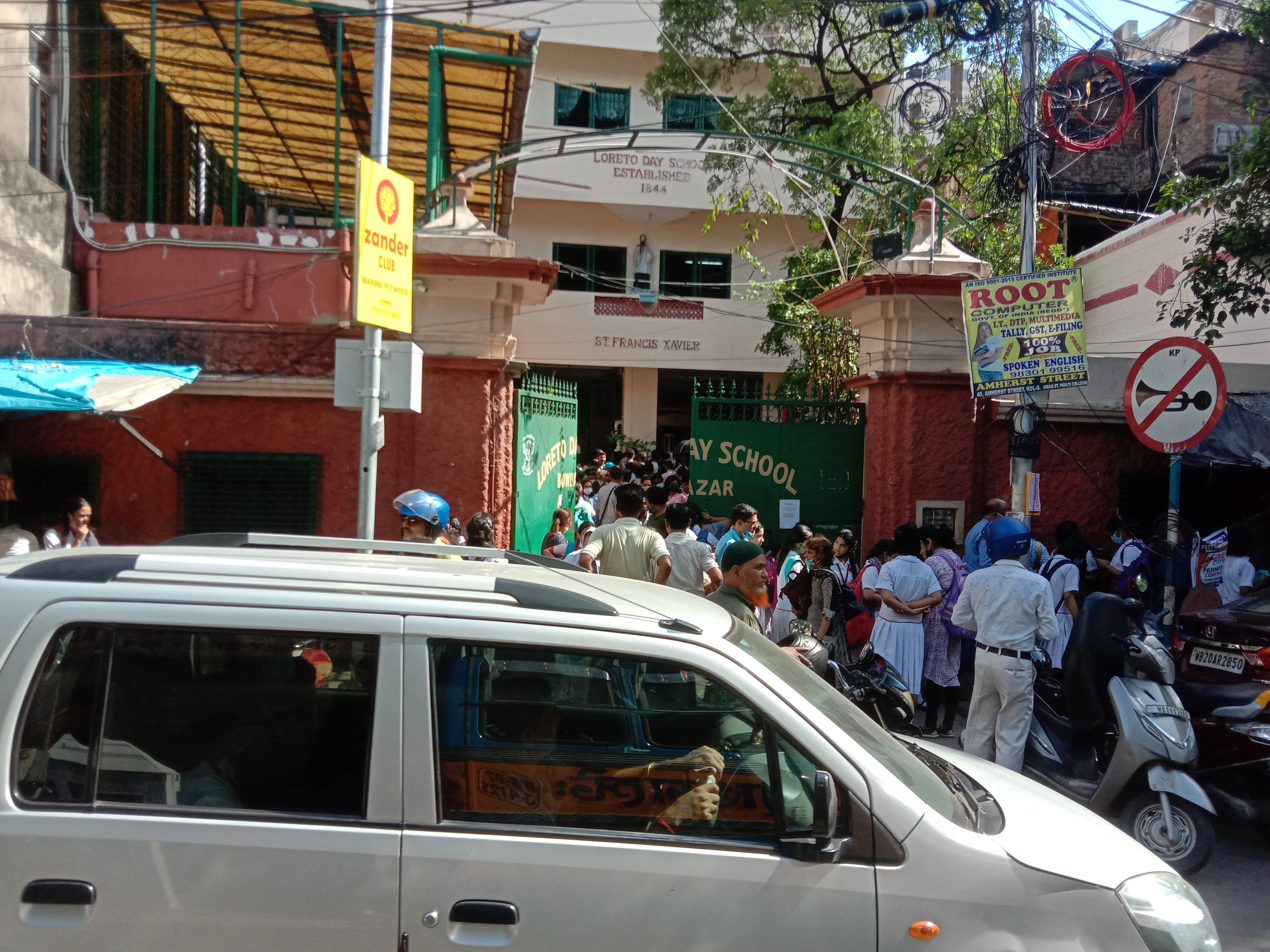
Loreto Day School, a Roman Catholic girls' school, at Bowbazar.

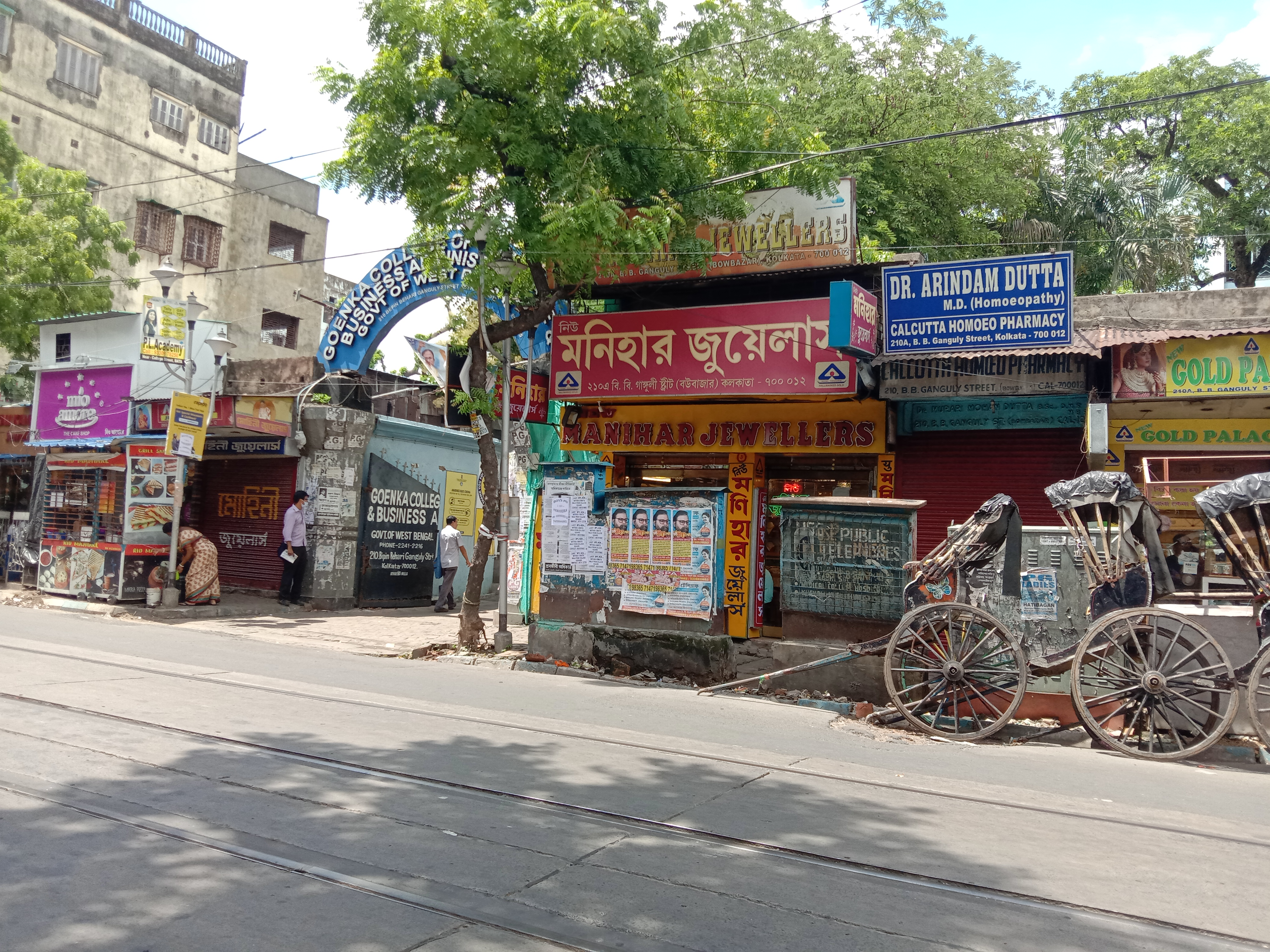
Goenka College of Commerce and Business Administration entrance

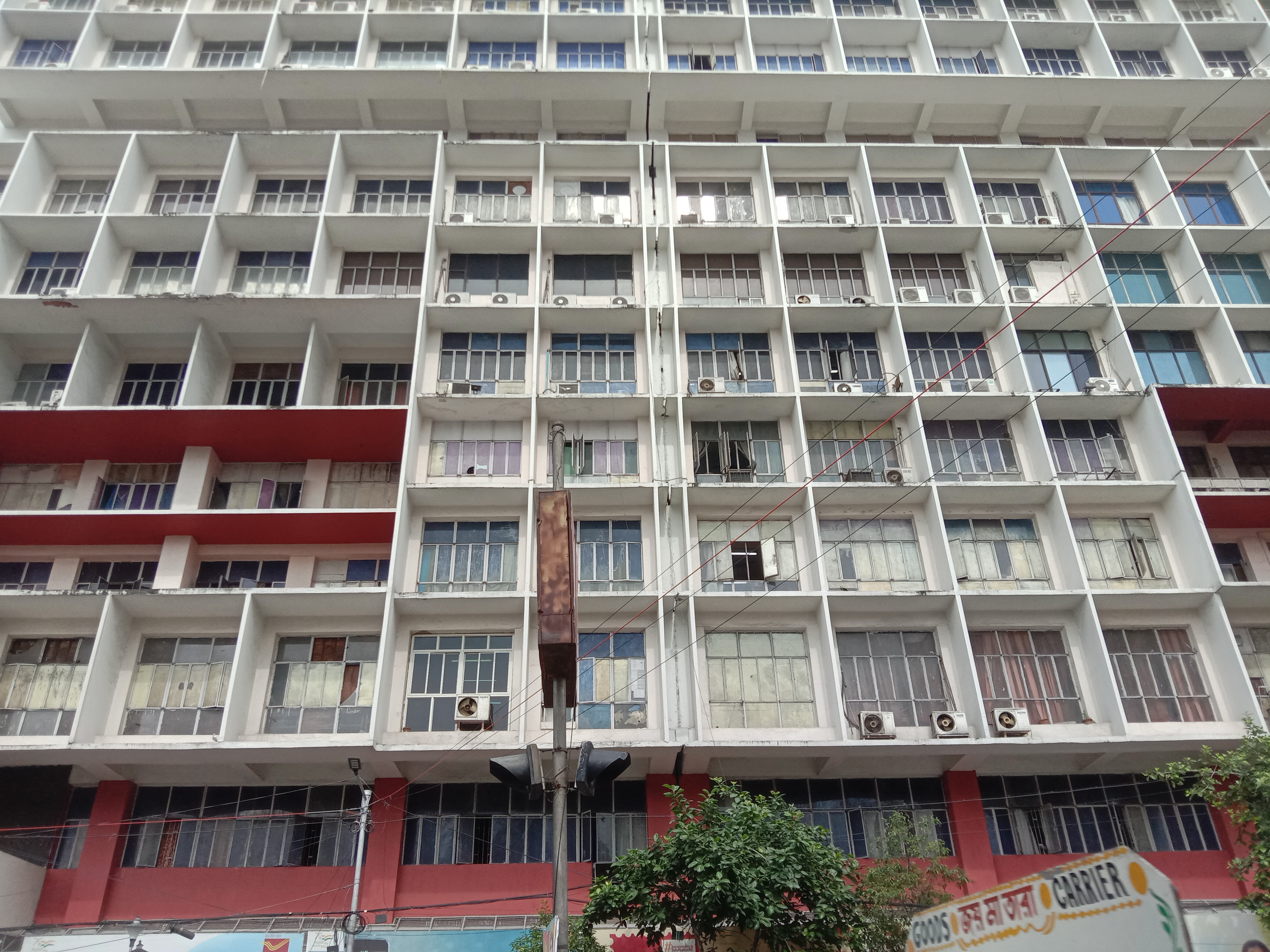
Yogayog Bhawan (headquarters of the West Bengal wing of India Post), Chittaranjan Avenue, Bowbazar.

== See also ==
- Bowbazar (Vidhan Sabha constituency)
