= Agamani-Vijaya =

Agamani (Sanskrit: अगमनि विजया) (Bengali: আগমনী গান) are genres of Bengali folk songs celebrating the return of the Goddess Parvati to the home of her parents on the eve of the Hindu autumn festival of Durga Puja. The Aagamani songs describe the return of Parvati to in her rural home, not as Goddess but as daughter, and are followed by Vijaya songs which describe the sorrow of separation three days later as Parvati returns to her husband Shiva.

The folklore that give origin to the songs are the mythological stories of Goddess Parvati- daughter of the mighty King of the Himalayas- who marries Lord Shiva. Shiva is described in Hindu mythology as the ageless hermit who is also pauper, and as such personifies the poor husband with little interest in the bonds of family life. One night in autumn, Parvati's mother Goddess Menaka dreamt of her daughter as did Parvati of her mother. Menaka urged her husband to bring Parvati home, even if just for the festival, and Parvati agrees at her father's request to return for the three days of the festival.

== See also ==
- Durga Puja
- Music of Bengal
- Parvati
