= Central metro station (Kolkata) =

Metro station in Kolkata, India

Central
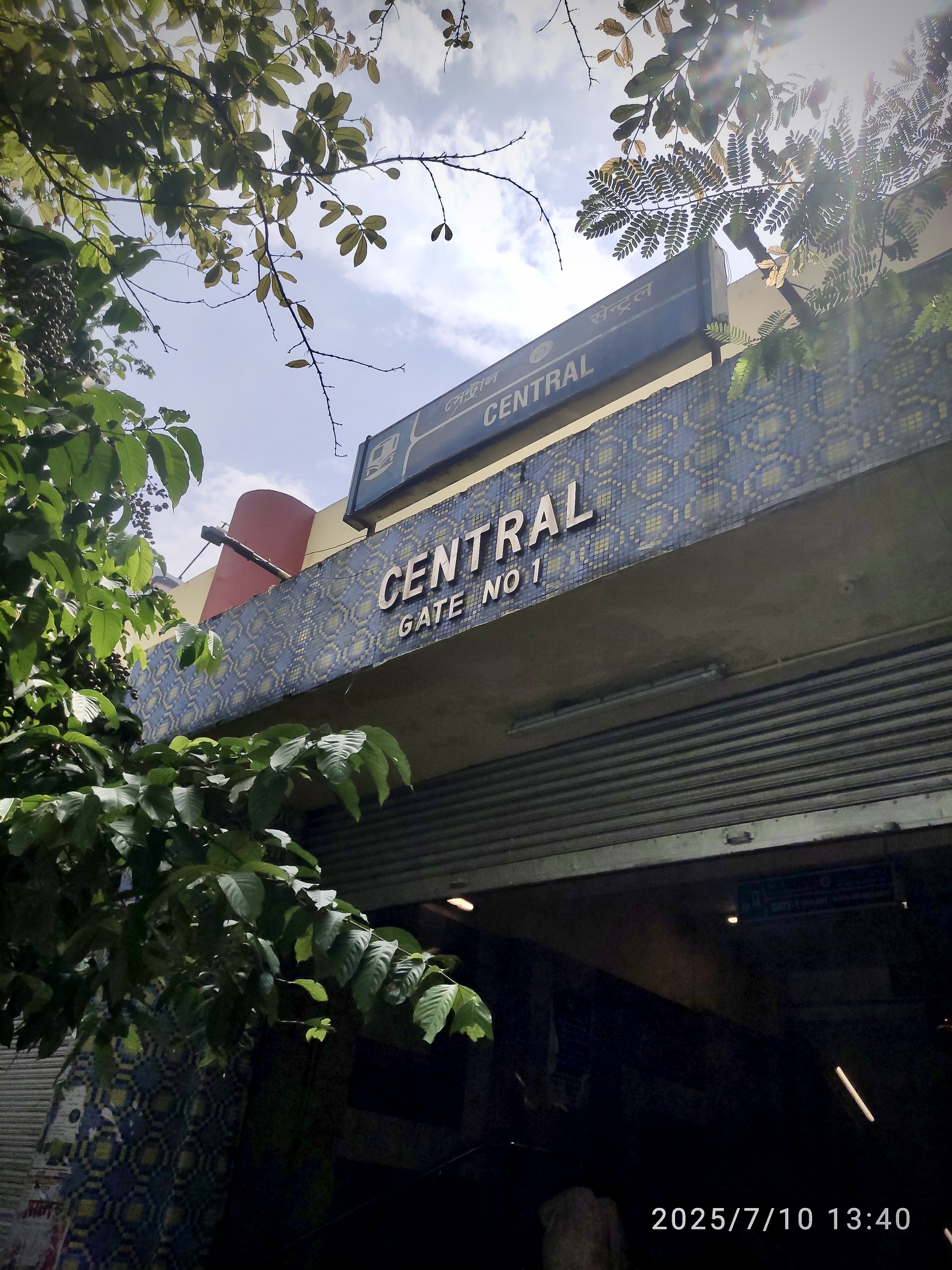
- Central Metro Station

General information
- Location: Bepin Behari Ganguly Street, Bowbazar; Kolkata, West Bengal 700012; India
- Coordinates: 22.572470°N 88.358788°E
- System: Kolkata Metro
- Operator: Metro Railway, Kolkata
- Line: Blue Line
- Platforms: Spanish solution (2 side platforms; 1 island platform)

Construction
- Structure type: Underground
- Accessible: No

Other information
- Status: Operational
- Station code: KCEN

History
- Opened: 19 February 1995; 31 years ago

Services
Preceding station	Kolkata Metro	Following station
Mahatma Gandhi Road towards Dakshineswar	Blue Line	Chandni Chowk towards Shahid Khudiram
Route map
Location

Central is an underground metro station on the North-South corridor of the Blue Line of Kolkata Metro on the crossing of Bepin Behari Ganguly Street and Central Avenue in Bowbazar, Kolkata, West Bengal, India.

== Structure ==
The station has a central island platform and two side platforms. Between each side platform and the island platform is a track, serving up and down trains. The station was built in this layout as it was anticipated that the Green Line will interchange with Blue Line at this station and the layout will effectively handle all the traffic. However, that did not happen and the side platforms, thus will never be used. Instead of opening doors on both sides, trains open doors on the right side, that is towards the island platform.

== Station layout ==
The station employs a Spanish solution with a combination of island and side platforms to facilitate efficient passenger movement.

G	Ground level	Exit/Entrance
L1	Concourse	Fare control, station agent, Ticket/token, shops, crossover
L2	Side platform (Not in service)
L2	Platform 2	towards Shahid Khudiram (Chandni Chowk) →
L2	Island platform, Doors will open on the right
L2	Platform 1	← towards Dakshineswar (Mahatma Gandhi Road)
L2	Side platform (Not in service)

== Connections ==
=== Bus ===
Bus route number 3B, 12C/2, 13, 30C, 43, 47B, 78, 214, 214A, 222, 237, 242, S119 (Mini), S122 (Mini), S139 (Mini), S151 (Mini), S152 (Mini), S158 (Mini), S159 (Mini), S160 (Mini), S161 (Mini), S163 (Mini), S164 (Mini), S165 (Mini), S171 (Mini), S173 (Mini), S175 (Mini), S181 (Mini), S184 (Mini), C24, E25, MIDI1, S3A, S3B, S9A, S10, S11, S15G, S17A, S57, AC20, AC39, VS1 etc. serve the station.

== Entry/Exit ==
- 1 – Indian Airlines
- 2 – Lal Bazar
- 3 – RITES Building
- 4 – Yogayog Bhavan
- 5 – Poddar Court
- 6 – Medical College
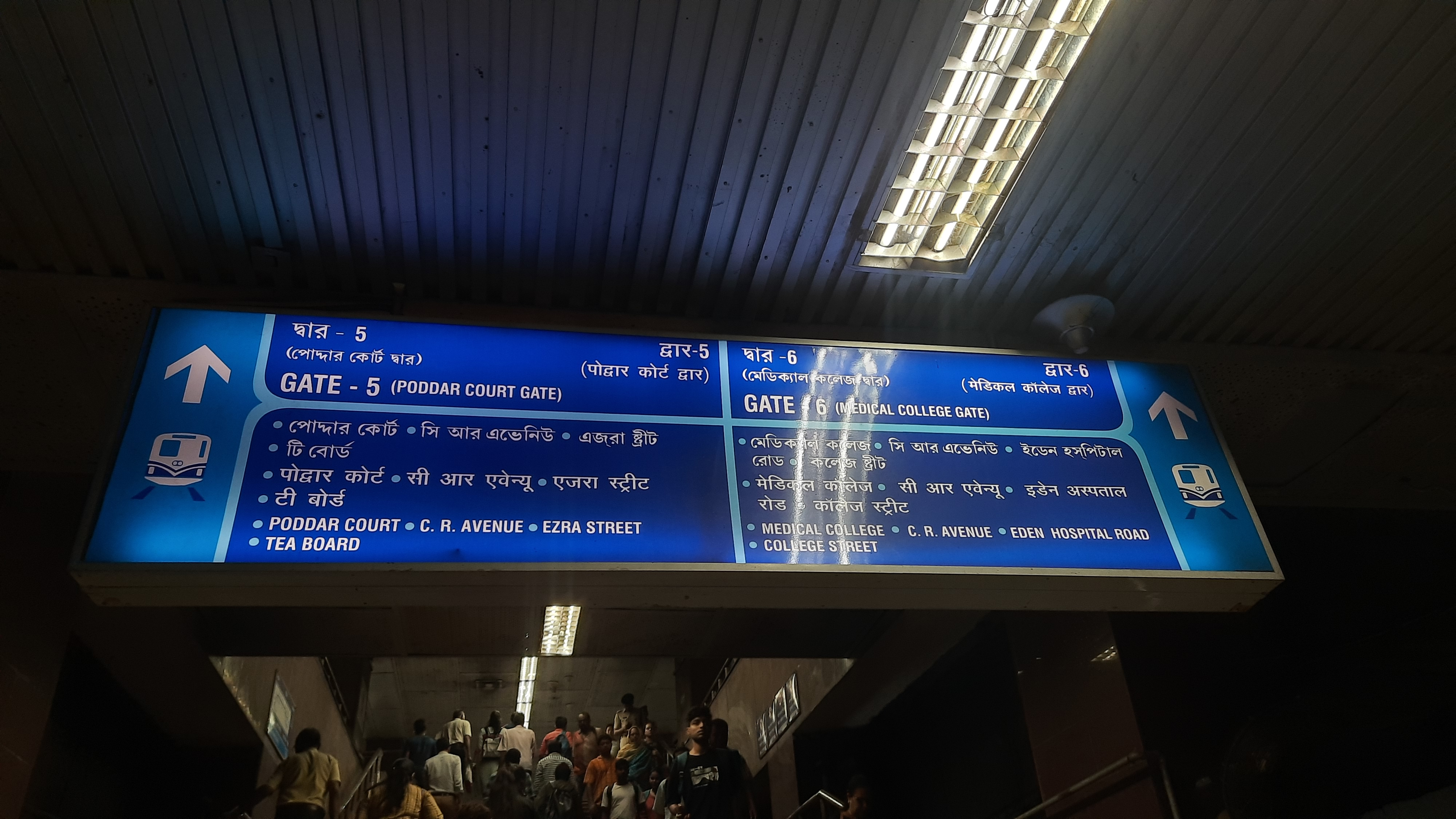

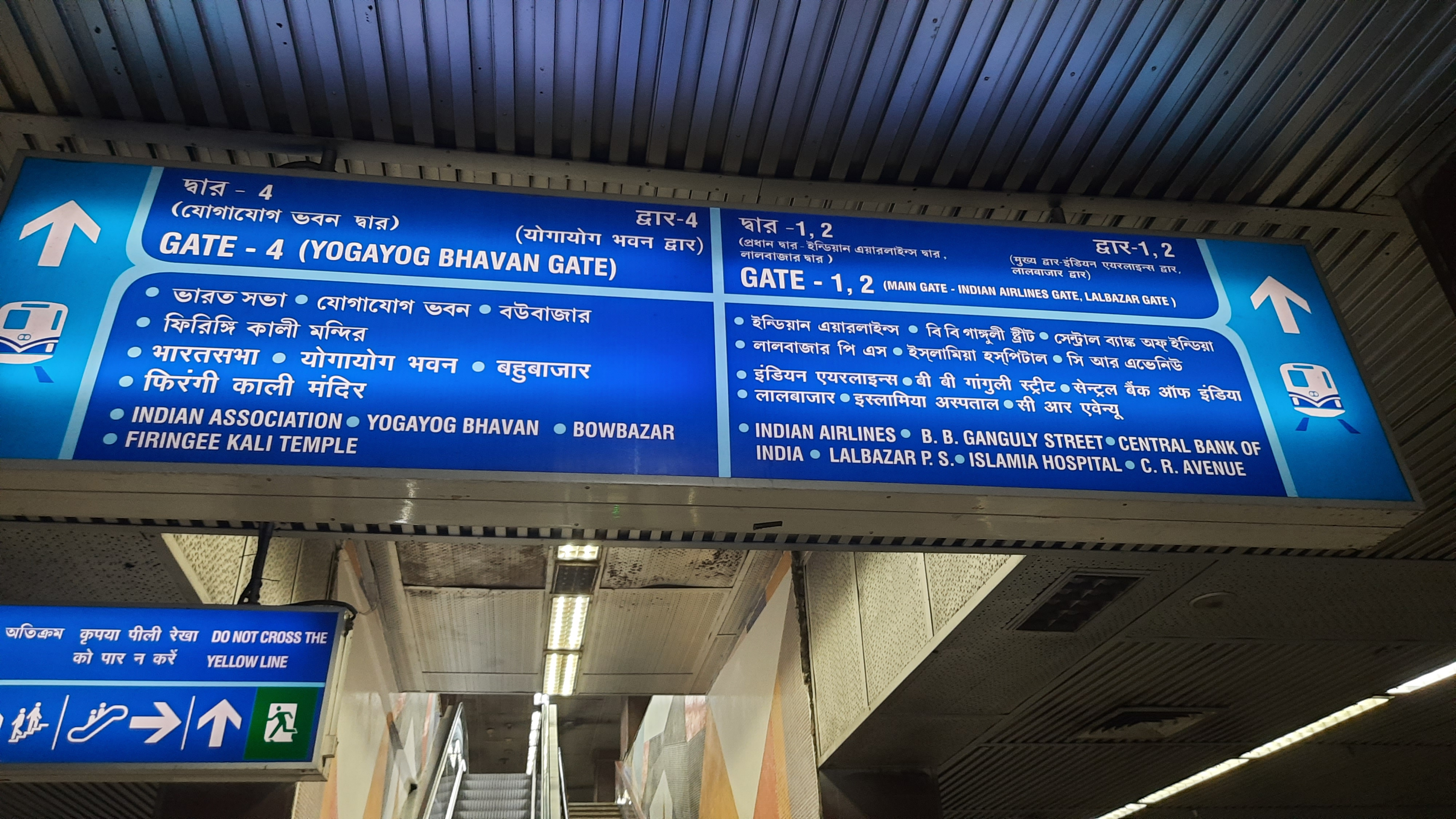

== See also ==
- Kolkata
- List of Kolkata Metro stations
- Transport in Kolkata
- Kolkata Metro Rail Corporation
- Kolkata Suburban Railway
- Kolkata Monorail
- Trams in Kolkata
- Bhowanipore
- Chowringhee Road
- List of rapid transit systems
- List of metro systems
