= Bipin Behari Ganguli =

Indian revolutionary (1887–1954)

Bipin Bihari Ganguly
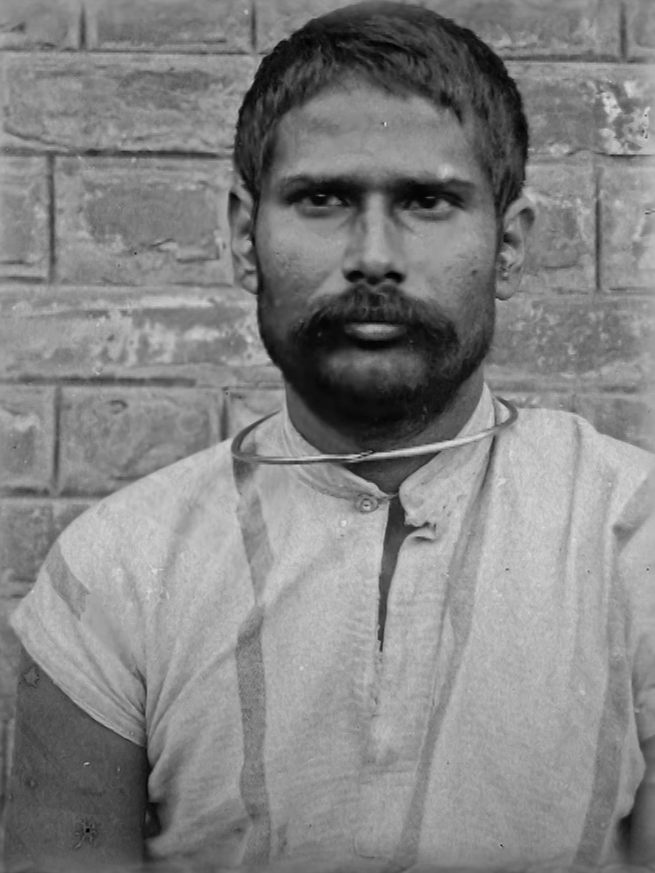
- Photograpgh taken after his arrest
- Born: 5 November 1887; Halisahar, Bengal Presidency, British India (present-day North 24 Parganas, West Bengal, India)
- Died: 14 January 1954 (aged 66); Calcutta, West Bengal, India
- Occupation: Indian Independence Activist
- Political party: Indian National Congress

Bipin Behari Ganguly (5 November 1887 – 14 January 1954) was a member of Indian independence movement and a politician. He was born in Halisahar, Bengal Presidency (now in West Bengal), on 5 November 1887. His father's name was Akshaynath Ganguly.

== Revolutionary activities ==
As a close associate of Barindra Kumar Ghosh and Rashbehari Bose he took active part in the revolutionary activities. He had a direct connection to the incidents like Muraripukur conspiracy and the bomb case. He was the founder member of Atmonnati Samiti, a secret revolutionary society and a fraction of Jugantar Group.

During the beginning of World War I (1914–1918), the Indian revolutionaries decided to do something daring which would result in the procuration of a sufficient number of firearms for their cause of the struggle for Indian Independence. Already the scenario of protest against the British Rule had increased to an extreme after the 1905 partition of Bengal. It started with sedition case against the 'Vande Matram' newspaper charging leaders like Aurobindo Ghosh and Bipin Bihari Ganguly to prove their involvement in promoting protests against the Government. Bipin Bihari Ganguly was imprisoned for 6 months.

Bipin Behari Ganguli planned a daring armed robbery on 24 August 1914. The robbery is known as "Rodda company arms heist". The heist took place on 26 August 1914 and was a very sensational incident. The Statesman, in its edition on 30 August 1914 described the heist as "The greatest daylight robbery".

In 1915, the robbery of car by the Jugantar group and in the office of a Businessman in Beliaghata, Kolkata, he assisted Jatindranath Mukherjee. He was arrested for those incidents with arms.

Bipin Behari Ganguli joined the Indian National Congress during the Non-Cooperation Movement in 1921 and presided over at the conference of Bengal State Committee in 1930. He joined at the Quit India movement in 1942. He was imprisoned at Mandalay, Rangoon and Alipore on 24 occasions throughout his life.

== Political activities ==
Before independence, Bipin Behari Ganguli was associated with the trade union movement. He became the President of the Bengal unit of Indian National Trade Union Congress. After Indian independence he held a ministerial post in West Bengal government being a member from Bijpur in West Bengal Legislative Assembly in the first general election held in 1952.

A street in the city of Kolkata has been named (B.B. Ganguly Street) after him.
