= Maniktala =

- Neighbourhood in Kolkata (Calcutta)
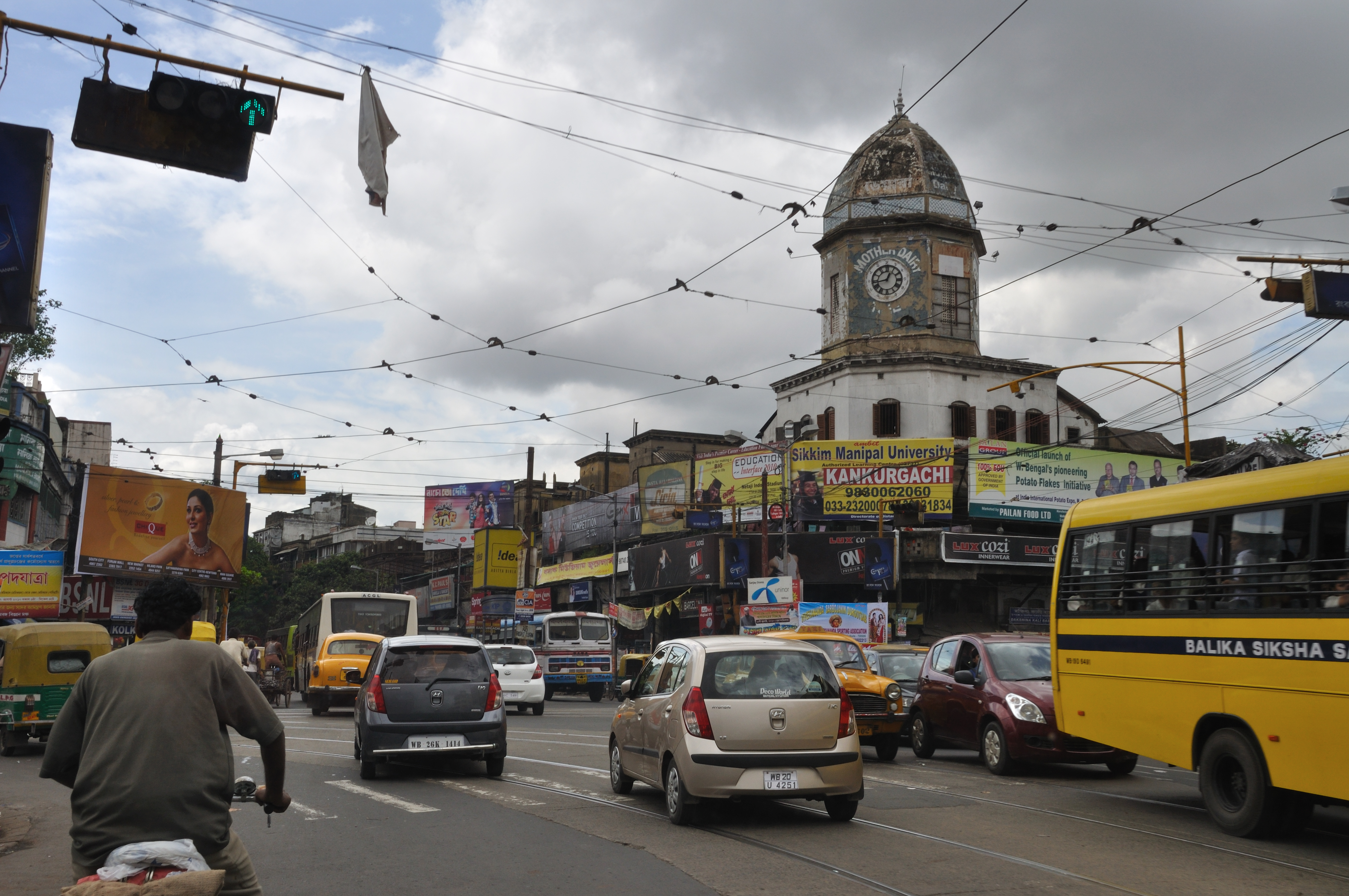
- Maniktala Crossing

- Location in Kolkata
- Coordinates: 22.585°N 88.375°E
- Country: India
- State: West Bengal
- City: Kolkata
- District: Kolkata
- Metro Station: Girish Park and Sealdah
- Municipal Corporation: Kolkata Municipal Corporation
- KMC wards: 15, 16, 27, 28
- Elevation: 36 ft (11 m)

Population
  - Total: For population see linked KMC ward pages
- Time zone: UTC+5:30 (IST)
- PIN: 700004, 700006, 700009
- Area code: +91 33
- Lok Sabha constituency: Kolkata Uttar
- Vidhan Sabha constituency: Maniktala, Jorasanko and Beleghata

Maniktala is a locality of North Kolkata in Kolkata district in the Indian state of West Bengal. It is one of the important junctions in North Kolkata.

== Etymology ==
The tomb of Manik Pir is located in lane near Maniktala crossing, therefore some locals suggest the neighbourhood is named after him.

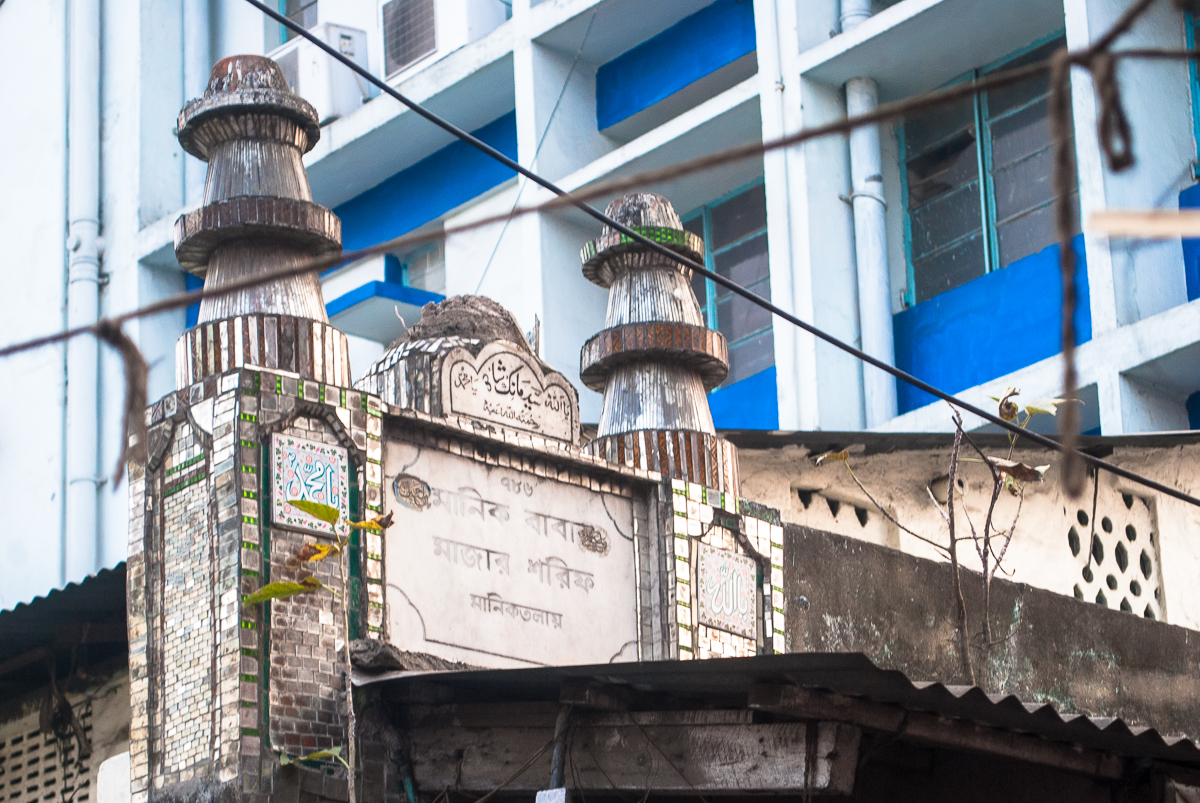
Dargah of Manik Pir

Others argue that Manik Pir (erst: Syed Husen Ud din shah) came from North India on early eighteenth century, while the name Maniktala can also be seen mentioned in a map as early as of 1784. Instead, they believe, the bodyguard of Nawab of Bengal Alivardi Khan, Manikchand Bose (erst : Manikram Bose) lived in this place as the caretaker of Calcutta (Ali Nagar) from/around 1756. Since he was very popular among the locals because of his wise and compassionate nature, the place came to be known as Maniktala.

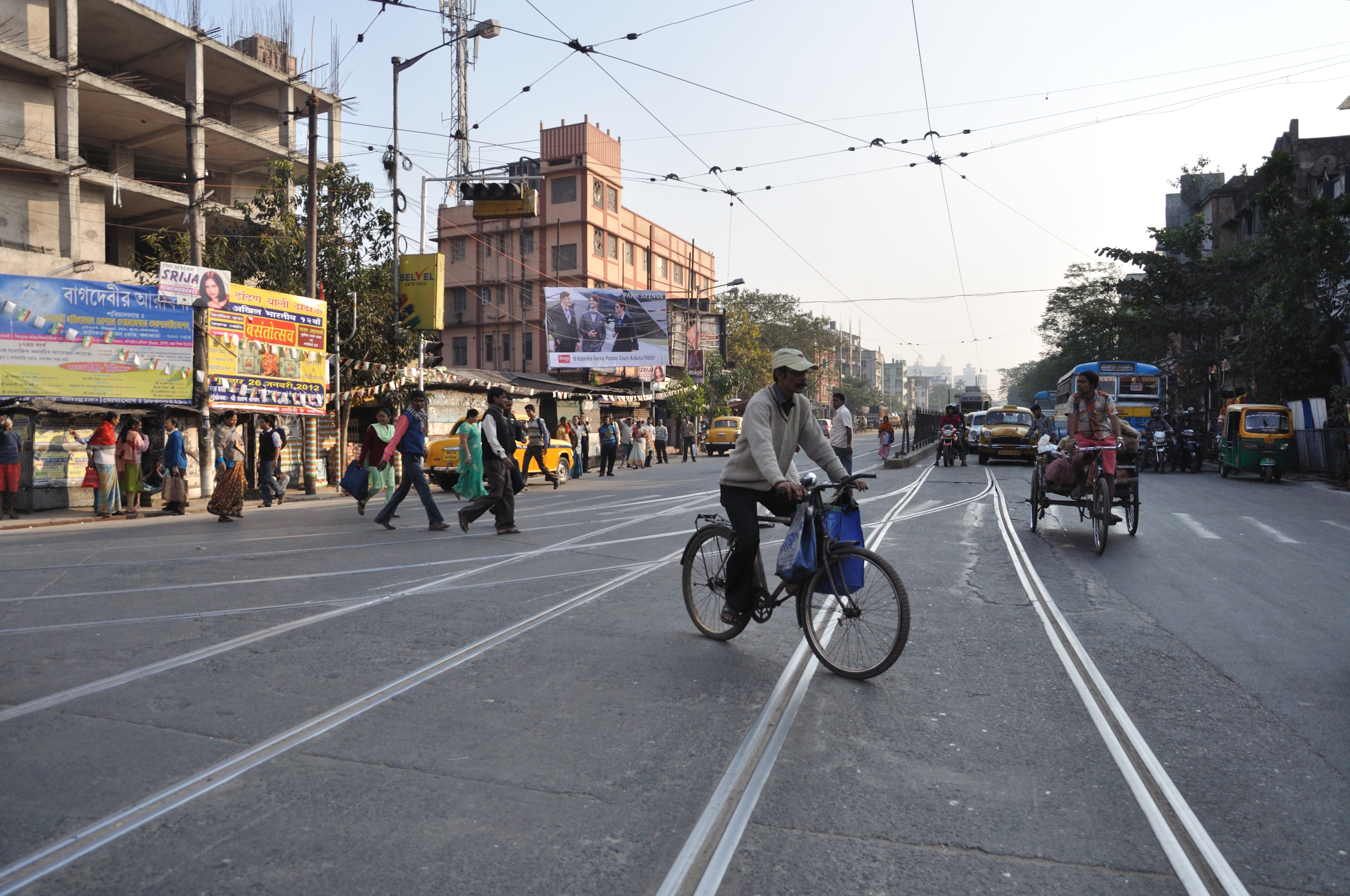
Acharya Prafulla Chandra Road in Maniktala

== History ==
In 1889, the suburbs of old Calcutta were grouped in four municipalities. Maniktala formed the East Suburban Municipality. In the same year, Maniktala, Ultadanga and Beliaghata became 'fringe area wards' of Kolkata Municipal Corporation. The Calcutta Municipal Act of 1923 brought about important changes. The adjacent municipalities of Cossipore, Chitpur, Maniktala and Garden Reach were amalgamated with Kolkata. Garden Reach was later taken out.

== Geography ==
=== Location ===
Maniktala crossing is the intersection of Vivekananda Road (Maniktala Main Road) and Acharya Prafulla Chandra Road (Upper Circular Road) — two main thoroughfares in North Kolkata. Beadon Street (Dani Ghosh Sarani/Abhedananda Road), one of the important streets of North Kolkata originates from Maniktala, ending in Nimtala Ghat. Amherst Street also starts nearby (Chaltabagan). Aurobindo Sarani crosses APC Road at Khanna crossing, Maniktala. Maniktala crossing connects Shyambazar, Kankurgachi, Rajabazar and Girish Park to Maniktala.

=== Police district ===
Manicktala police station is part of the Eastern Suburban division of Kolkata Police. It is located at 20, Canal West Road, Kolkata-700006.

Ultadanga Women police station covers all police districts under the jurisdiction of the Eastern Suburban division i.e. Beliaghata, Entally, Maniktala, Narkeldanga, Ultadanga, Tangra and Phoolbagan.

=== Landmarks ===
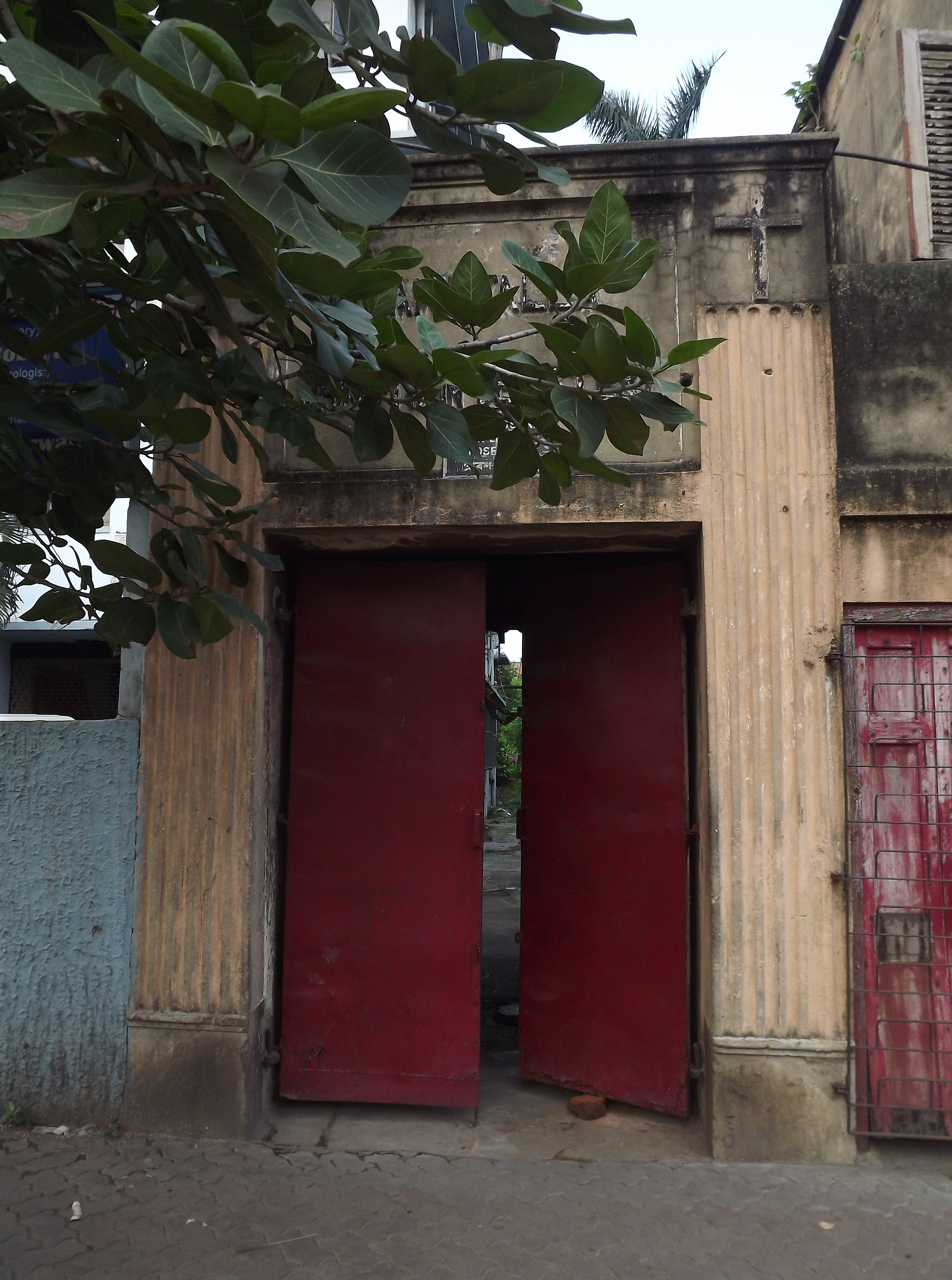
Maniktala Christian Cemetery

The Central Blood Bank of West Bengal Government is located at the Maniktala crossing. So is one of oldest markets of Kolkata, the Maniktala Bazar, easily identified by the clock tower. Gouribari Badridas Jain Temple is also located nearby.

== Economy ==
=== Daily markets ===
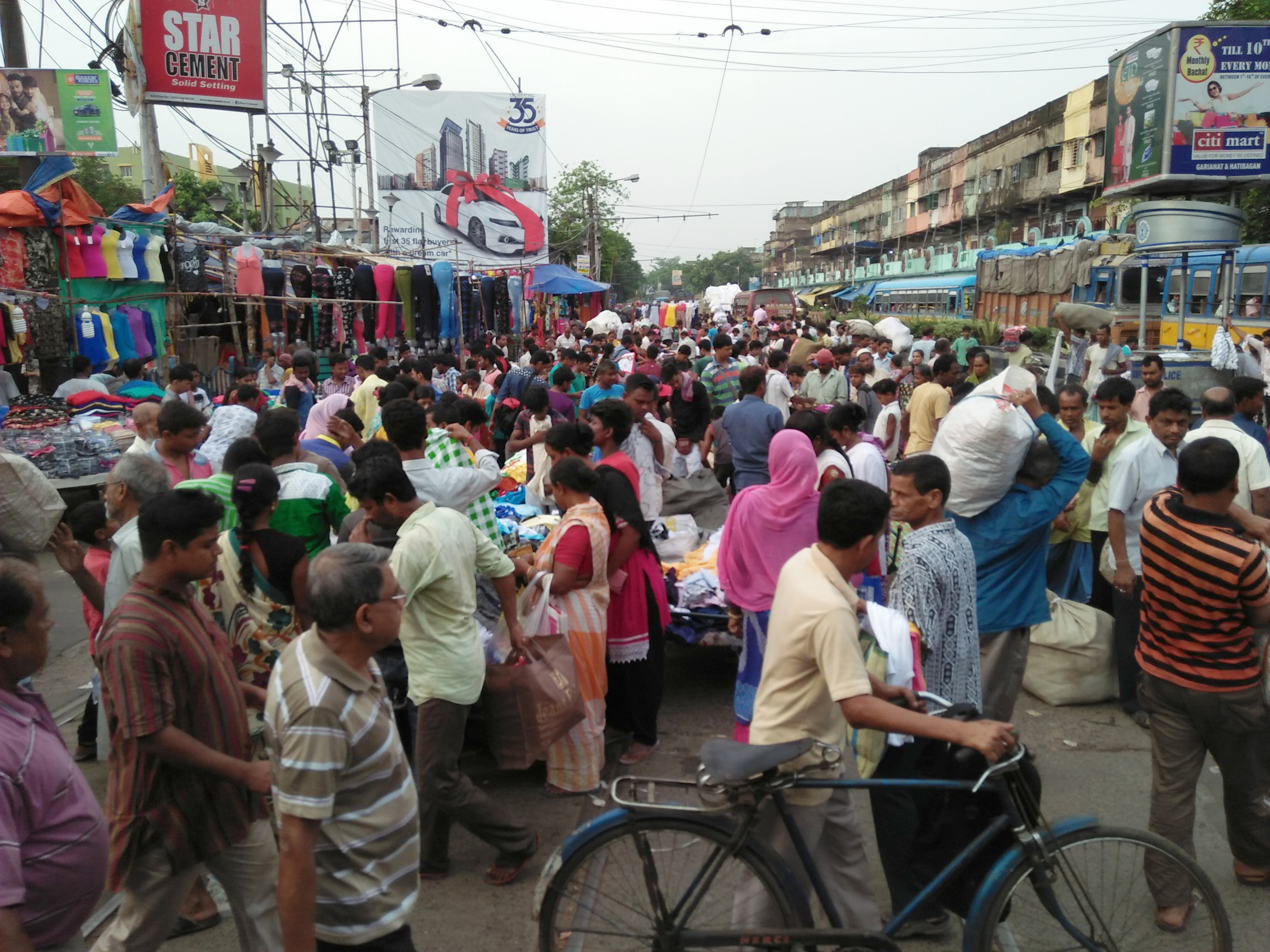
Harisha Haat, Khanna Cinema Crossing, Maniktala

Maniktala market, along with Hatibagan, Sealdah, Lake Market and Gariahat markets, is amongst the largest markets in Kolkata. It is owned by SC Nan and family. "The vintage landmark of the clock tower in Maniktala helps to spot the interiors of this market well." Maniktala is famous for its fish market but is also popular for groceries and fresh vegetables. It is one of the best farmer's markets in Kolkata. Maniktala Market at 187, Vivekananda Road is a private market spread over 3 acres. Vegetables, fruits, betel leaf, flowers, fish, meat, egg etc.are available. Maniktala Municipal Market is located at P-187, C.I.T. Road, Kankurgachi. In Kolkata, every para (neighbourhood) has a machher bazar (fish market), but there are some big fish markets in different areas of the city: Howrah wholesale fish market, Gariahat, Sealdah and Maniktala. These markets "are famous not only for the wide variety of fishes they procure but also for their stellar quality. Prices depend on the fish you want. The staple ones are competitively priced. However, the special fishes such as Iilish, Chitol, Chingri can go for some ridiculous pricing. But that's no deterrence for the fish lover who can't do without it in his lunch!" Maniktala market sets a sort of a bench-mark for the pricing.

== Transport ==
The Maratha Ditch was dug in 1742 and it was partly filled up in 1799 to create the Circular Road (now Acharya Prafulla Chandra Road).

=== WBTC Bus ===
- AC-39 (Airport - Howrah Stn)
- AC-30 (Lake Town - Howrah Stn)
- AC-2 (Barasat - Howrah Stn)
- EB-13 (Hatisala - Howrah Stn)
- VS-2 (Airport - Howrah Stn)
- VS-1 (Airport - Esplanade)
- S-3B (Behala - Kankurgachi)
- S-16 (Joka - Karunamoyee)

The construction of Vivekananda Road, by Calcutta Improvement Trust, was completed in 1928. It was a broad new road through a congested area and changed the complexion of the area. Many buses and auto-rickshaws ply along these roads.

Electric tramcars were introduced in Calcutta in 1902. Tram lines were laid to Rajabazar in 1910. The line along Upper Circular Road to Galiff Street came in 1941. A new tram line was laid from Maniktala to Ultadanga in 1985. Now Kolkata tram route no. 18 serves Maniktala (via APC Road-Vivekananda Road/Maniktala Main Road).

== Culture ==
One of Kolkata's largest Durga Puja celebration, the Manicktalla Chaltabagan Lohapatty Durga Puja is celebrated in its vicinity.
