= Amherst Street (Kolkata) =

Road in Kolkata, India

Raja Rammohan Roy Sarani
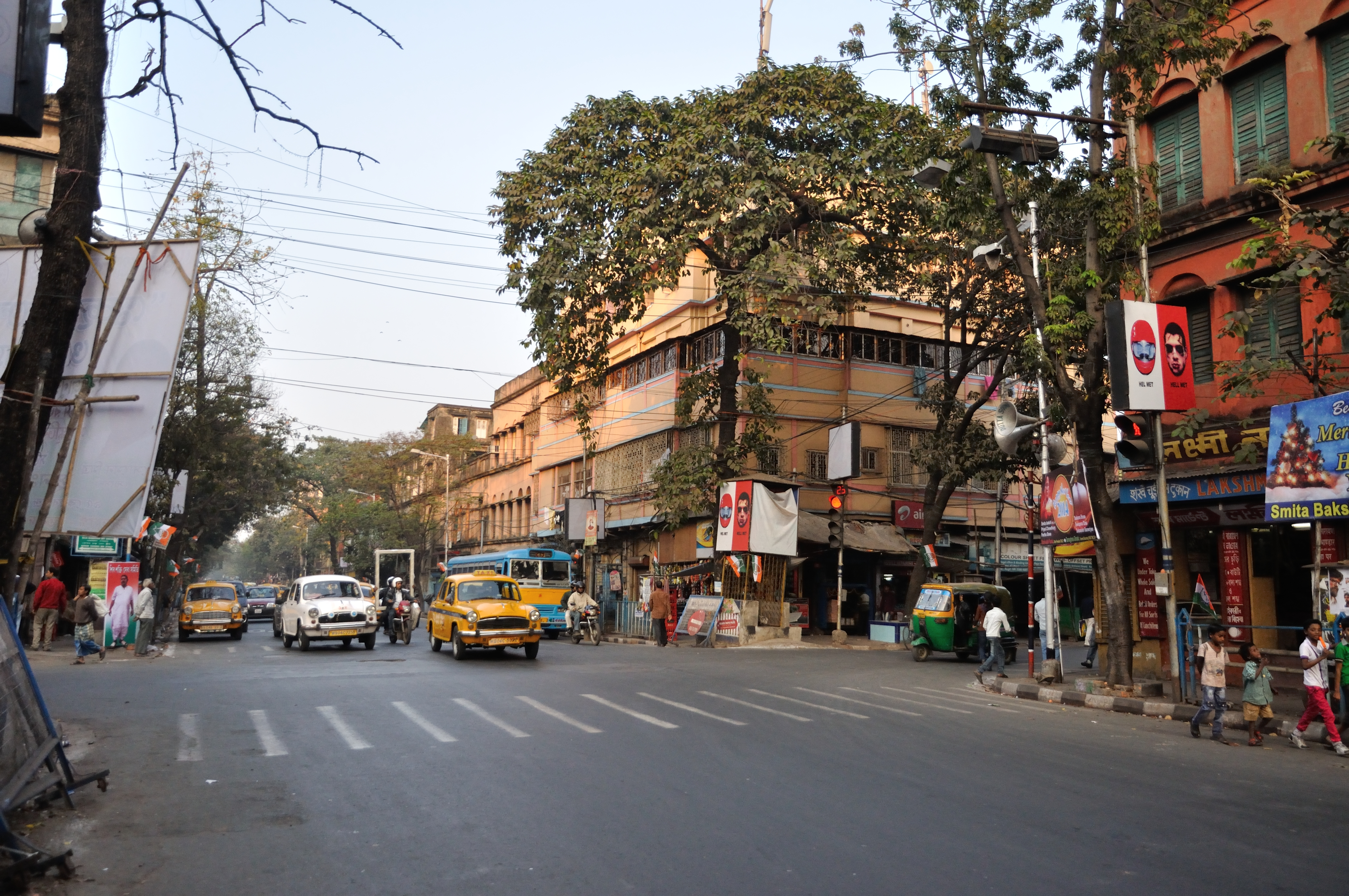
- Amherst Street and Keshab Chandra Sen Street Crossing
- Interactive map of Raja Rammohan Roy Sarani
- Former name: Amherst Street
- Maintained by: Kolkata Municipal Corporation
- Location: Kolkata, India
- Postal code: 700009
- Nearest Kolkata Metro station: Girish Park, MG Road, Central and Sealdah
- Coordinates: 22.5791049°N 88.369807°E
- North end: Chaltabagan, Maniktala
- South end: Lebutala, Bowbazar

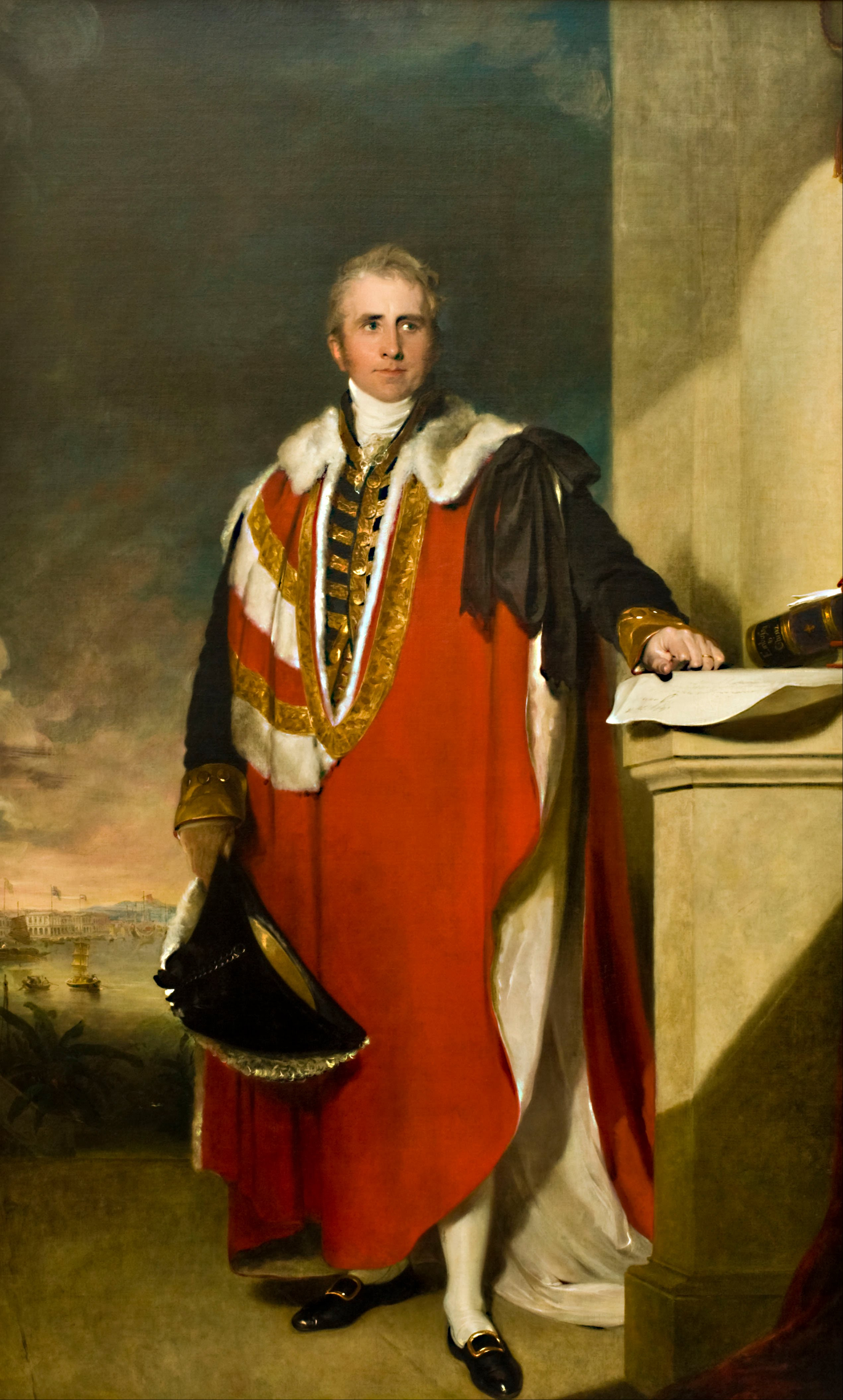
William Amherst, 1st Earl Amherst, after whom the street was first named.

Amherst Street is a north–south street in Central Kolkata in the Indian state of West Bengal. The street was named after William Amherst, 1st Earl Amherst. It has been renamed as Raja Rammohan Roy Sarani after Raja Rammohan Roy, one of the most famous social-reformers of India. The road starts from Vivekananda Road crossing (Chaltabagan, Maniktala) and extends up to Bepin Behari Ganguly Street crossing (Lebutala, Bowbazar) via MG Road crossing and Surya Sen Street crossing. On the extreme north lies Raja Rammohan Roy Memorial Museum and on the extreme south lies the Bank of India (Bowbazar).

== Geography ==
=== Police district ===
Amherst Street police station is part of the North and North Suburban division of Kolkata Police. It is located at 57, Raja Rammohan Sarani, Kolkata-700009.

Amherst Street Women police station, located at the same address as above covers all police districts under the jurisdiction of the North and North Suburban division i.e. Amherst Street, Jorabagan, Shyampukur, Cossipore, Chitpur, Sinthi, Burtolla and Tala.

== Places of interest ==
=== Colleges ===
- St. Paul's Cathedral Mission College (estd. 1864)
- City College, Kolkata (estd. 1881), Anandamohan College (estd. 1961), Rammohan College (estd. 1961)

=== School ===
- St.Paul's School (estd. 1822) https://www.google.co.in/maps/place/St+Paul's+School/@22.5760887,88.366572,17z/data=!3m1!4b1!4m5!3m4!1s0x3a02764e1e88326d:0xad33002d7183da14!8m2!3d22.5760838!4d88.3687607

== Festivals ==
Some of the notable festivals that take place in and around the street include Chaltabagan Lohapatty Durga Puja, Somendra Nath Mitra's Kali Puja (Amherst Street Sarbojonin) and Jhamapukur Sarbojonin (Subal Chandra Lane) Tamoghna Ghosh's Kali Puja and Fatakesto's Kali Puja.

=== In popular culture ===
Born Into Brothels, a 2004 documentary film directed by Zana Briski mentions this street in the movie.

== Gallery ==
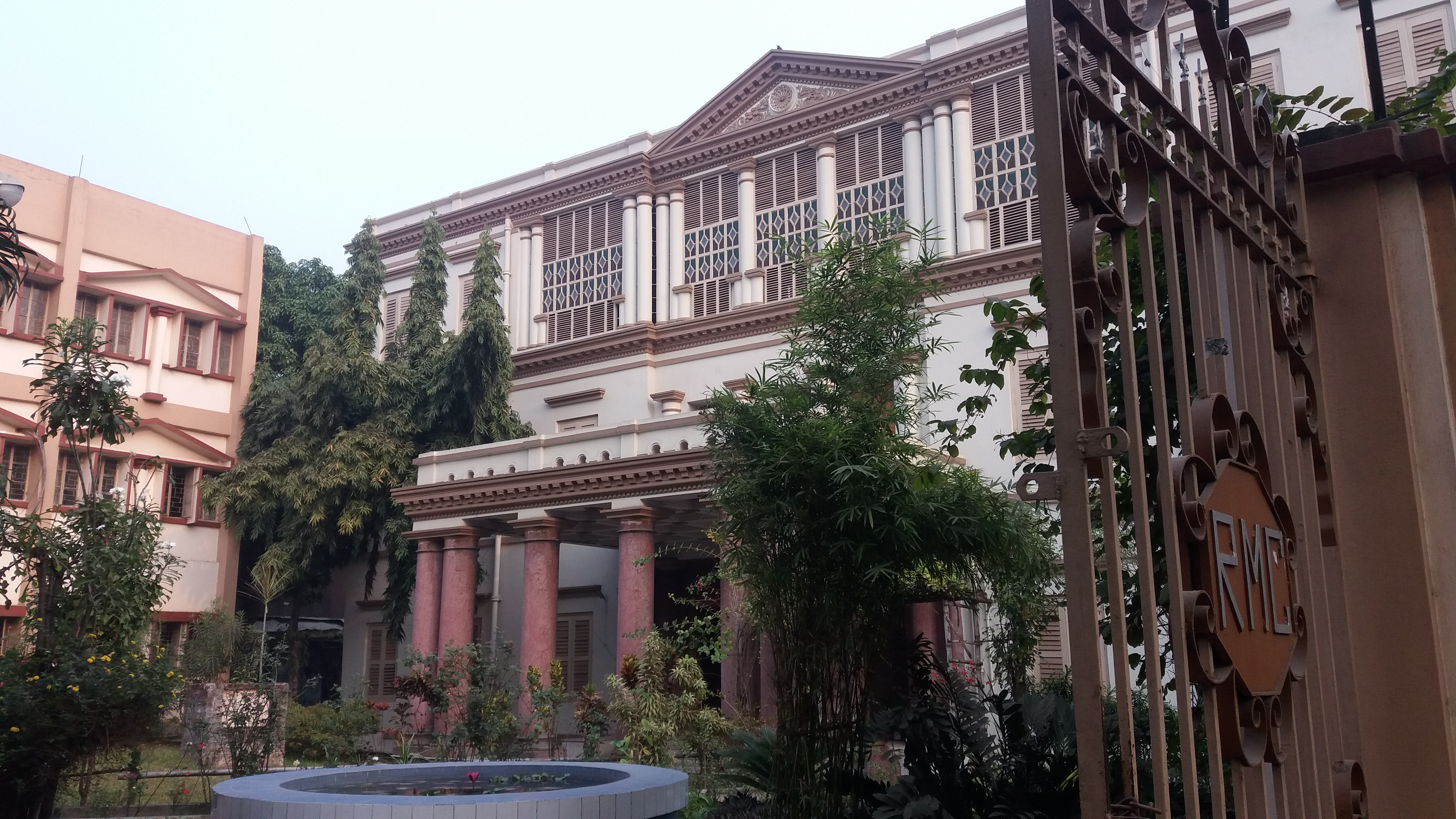
Raja Rammohan Roy Memorial Museum

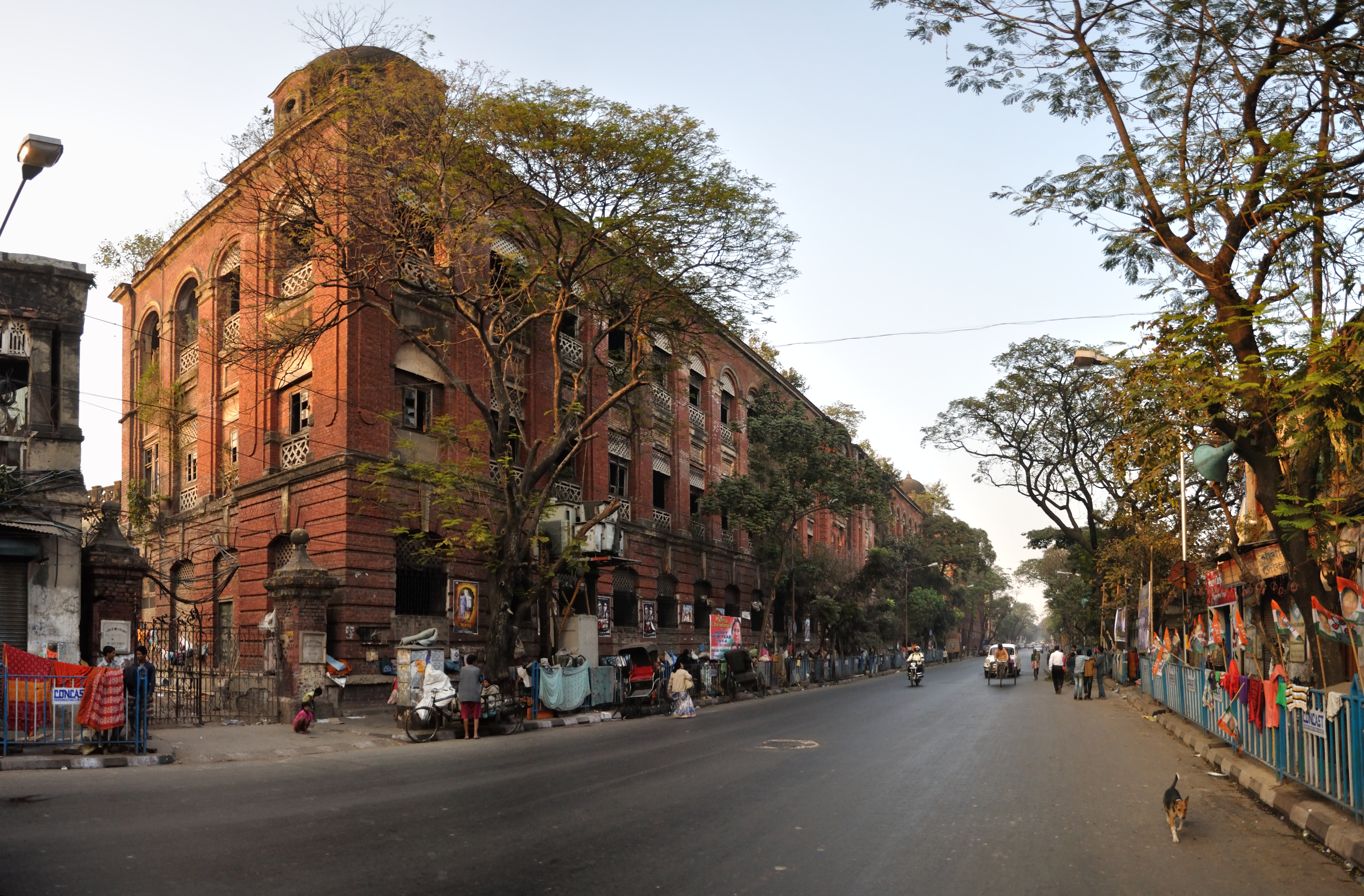
Shree Vishudhanand Saraswati Marwari Hospital

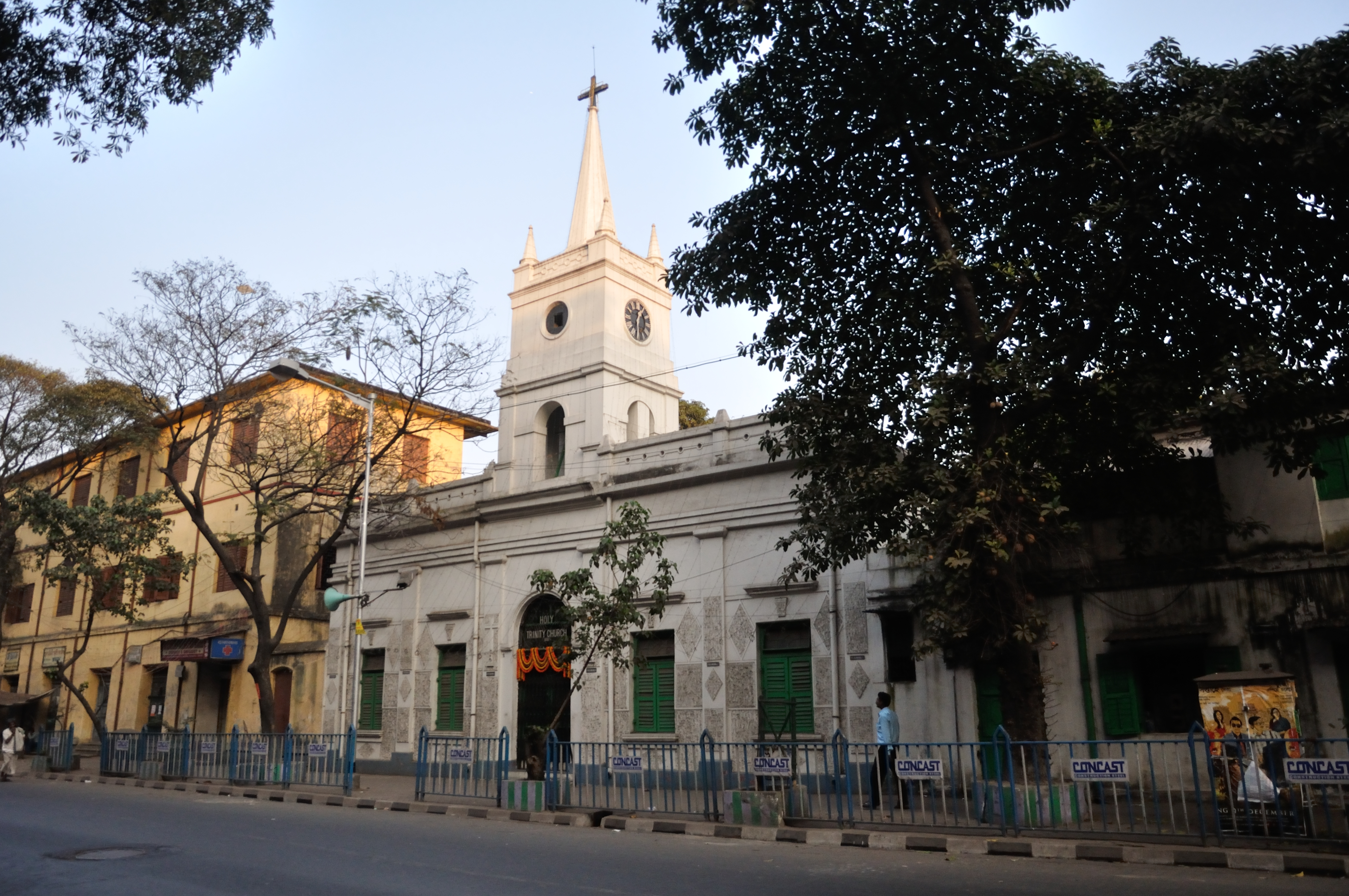
Holy Trinity Church (Kolkata)
