= Majerhat =

Majerhat is a locality in Kolkata, India. It may refer to the following locations in the area:

- Majerhat Bridge - a bridge in the area that collapsed in 2018
- Majerhat railway station - an Indian Eastern Railways train station
- Majerhat metro station - an under-construction metro station on Kolkata Metro Line 3
