= Chittaranjan Avenue, Kolkata =

Road in Kolkata, India

Chittaranjan Avenue
- C.R. Avenue
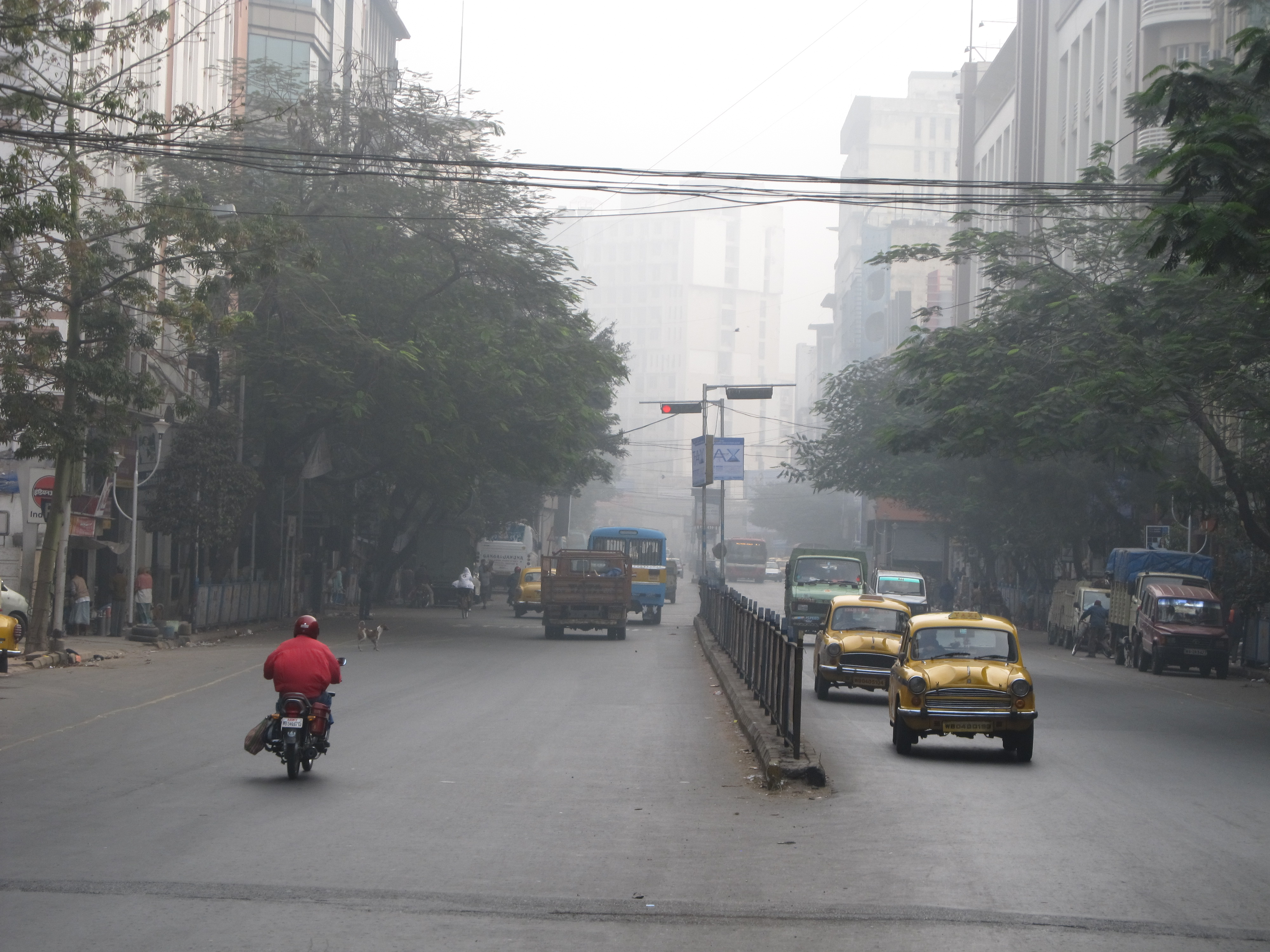
- Former name: Central Avenue
- Maintained by: Kolkata Municipal Corporation
- Location: Kolkata, India
- Postal code: 700006, 700007, 700012, 700072, 700073
- Nearest Kolkata Metro station: Girish Park; MG Road; Central; Chandni Chowk; Esplanade
- north end: Girish Park
- south end: Esplanade

Chittaranjan Avenue, commonly C.R. Avenue (Formerly known as Central Avenue) is a principal north-south thoroughfare in Central-North Kolkata. It starts from Beadon Street (Dani Ghosh Sarani/Abhedananda Road) crossing (Girish Park) in the north and ends at Chowringhee Road-Bentinck Street Junction (Esplanade) in the south. The road is renamed after Deshbandhu Chittaranjan Das, a nationalist politician and freedom-fighter of India. North of Beadon Street crossing, Central Avenue becomes Jatindra Mohan Avenue.

== Significance ==
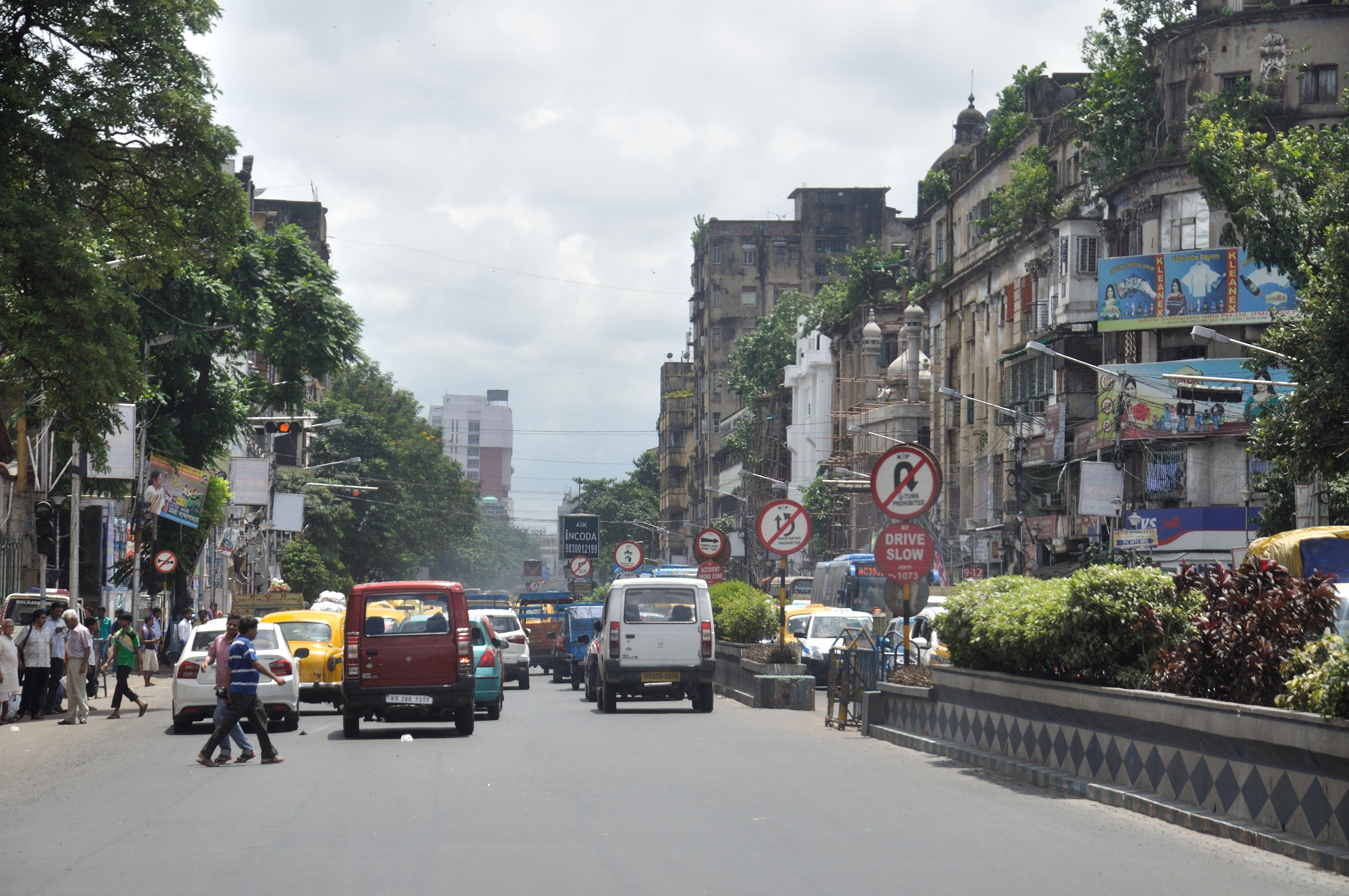
Traffic Jam on C.R. Avenue

The road is arterial in maintaining north to central and vice versa connection in Kolkata. The road remains always busy. A major portion of the Kolkata Metro Blue Line runs beneath this road. Several important places are on this road, including Beadon Street crossing, Girish Park, Vivekananda Road crossing, Jorasanko, Mahajati Sadan, MG Road crossing, Kolkata Medical College, All India Institute of Hygiene and Public Health, Bowbazar, Khirode Vidya Binode Avenue-Dr. Lalit Banerjee Sarani crossing, B.B. Ganguly Street crossing, Ganesh Chandra Avenue crossing, Chandni Chowk and Esplanade. This thoroughfare (earlier known as the 'Central Avenue') was built by the Calcutta Improvement Trust during the inter-war period. The process included massive displacement of populations in the central city. Social dislocations during the street-building process found expression in contemporary urban conflicts.

== Operation ==
The road is bi-directional throughout the day. Certain crossings are however unidirectional, that is, in certain crossings vehicles can turn only in a specific direction and the other direction-turning is a punishable crime.

== Gallery ==
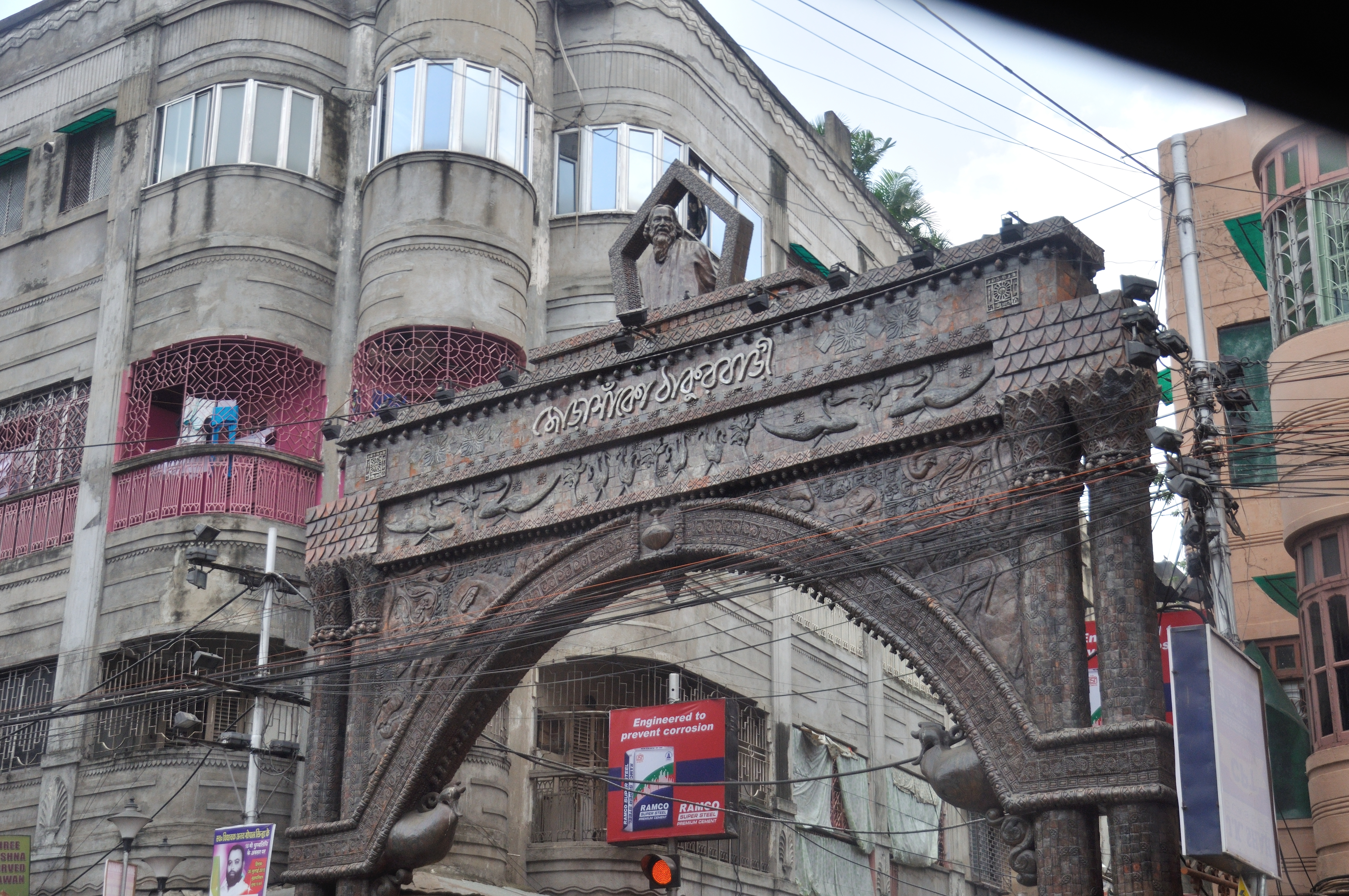
Jorasanko Thakur Bari Gate, C.R. Avenue

Calcutta School of Tropical Medicine, C.R. Avenue

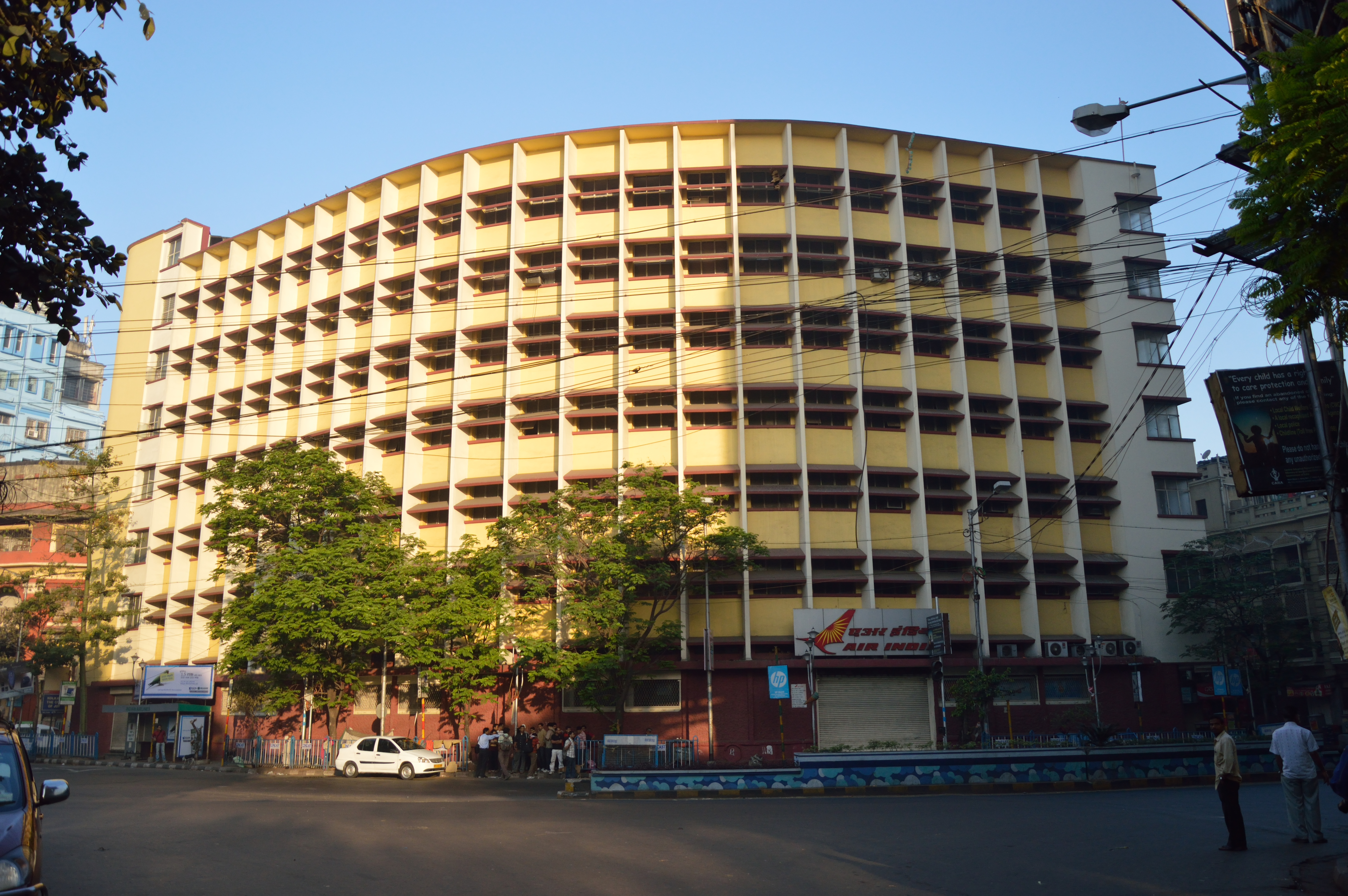
Airlines House, C.R. Avenue

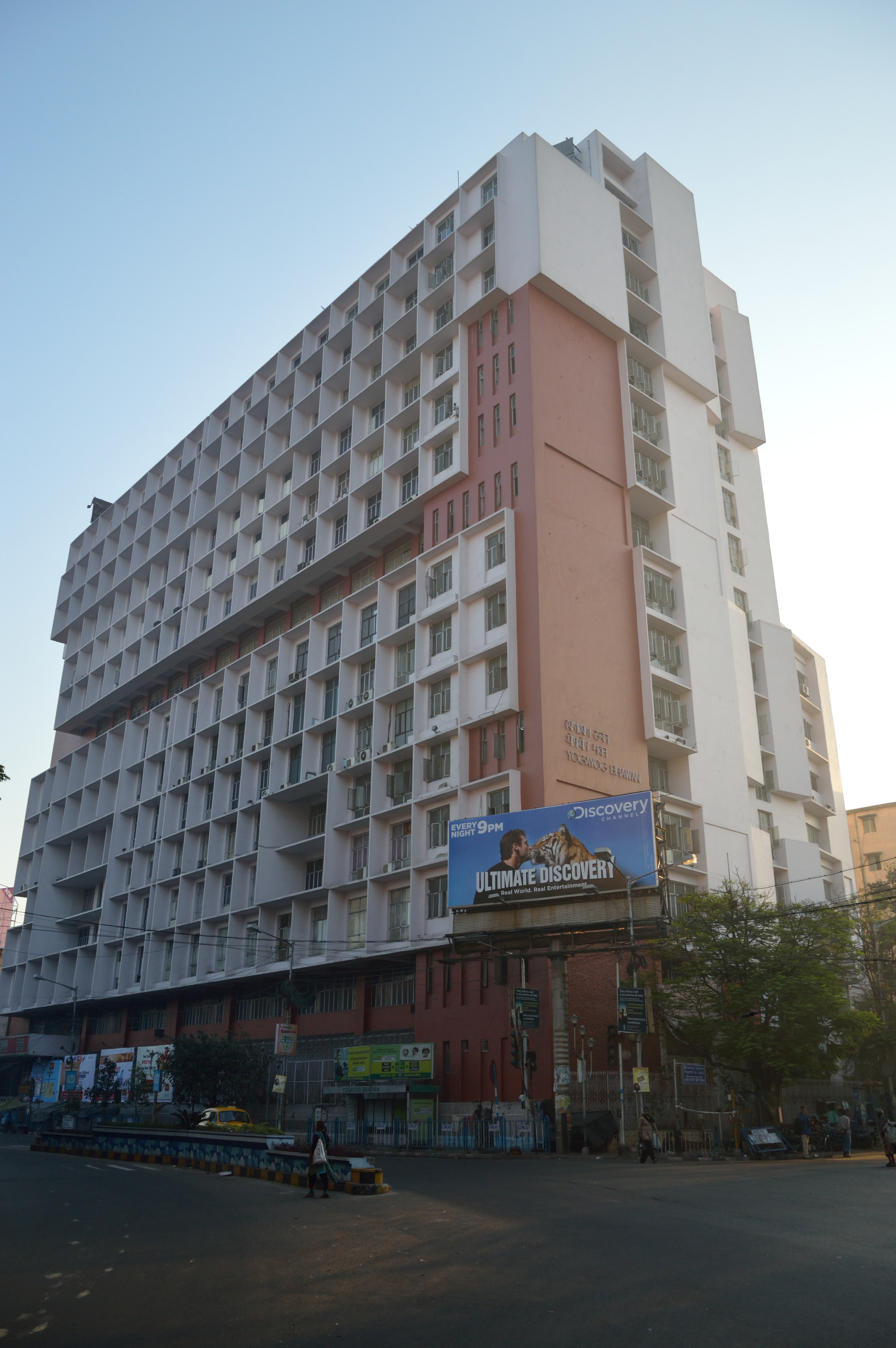
Yogayog Bhawan, C.R. Avenue
