= Chaltabagan Durga Puja =

Durga Puja celebration in Kolkata, India

The Manicktala Chaltabagan Lohapatty Durga Puja is a Durga Puja celebration in Kolkata, India. It was founded in 1943 by Late Sri Lakhi Chand Jaiswal

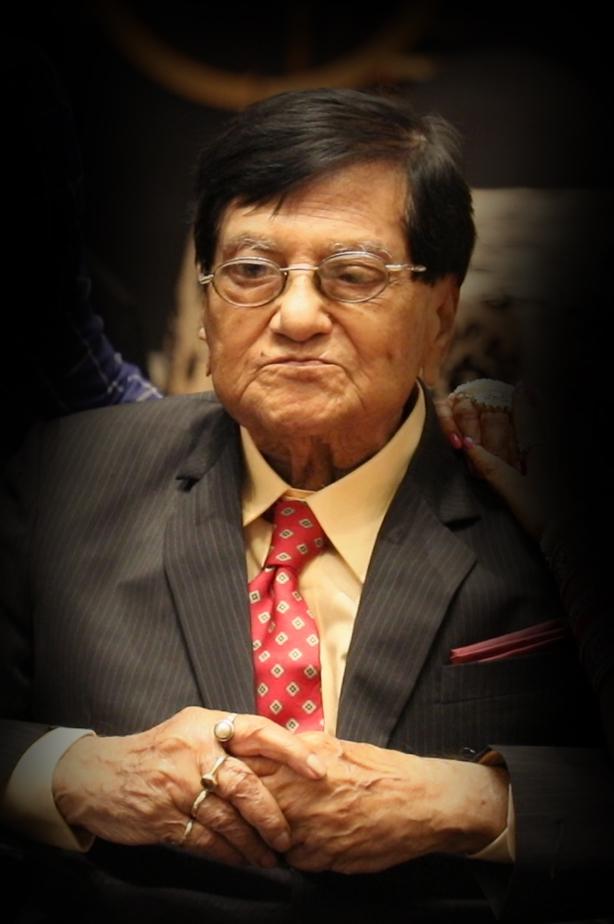
Shree Lakhi Chand Jaiswal

as a small celebration in a shop and has grown into one of Kolkata's largest & biggest Durga Puja celebrations, attended by celebrities, industrialists, politicians and foreign diplomats.

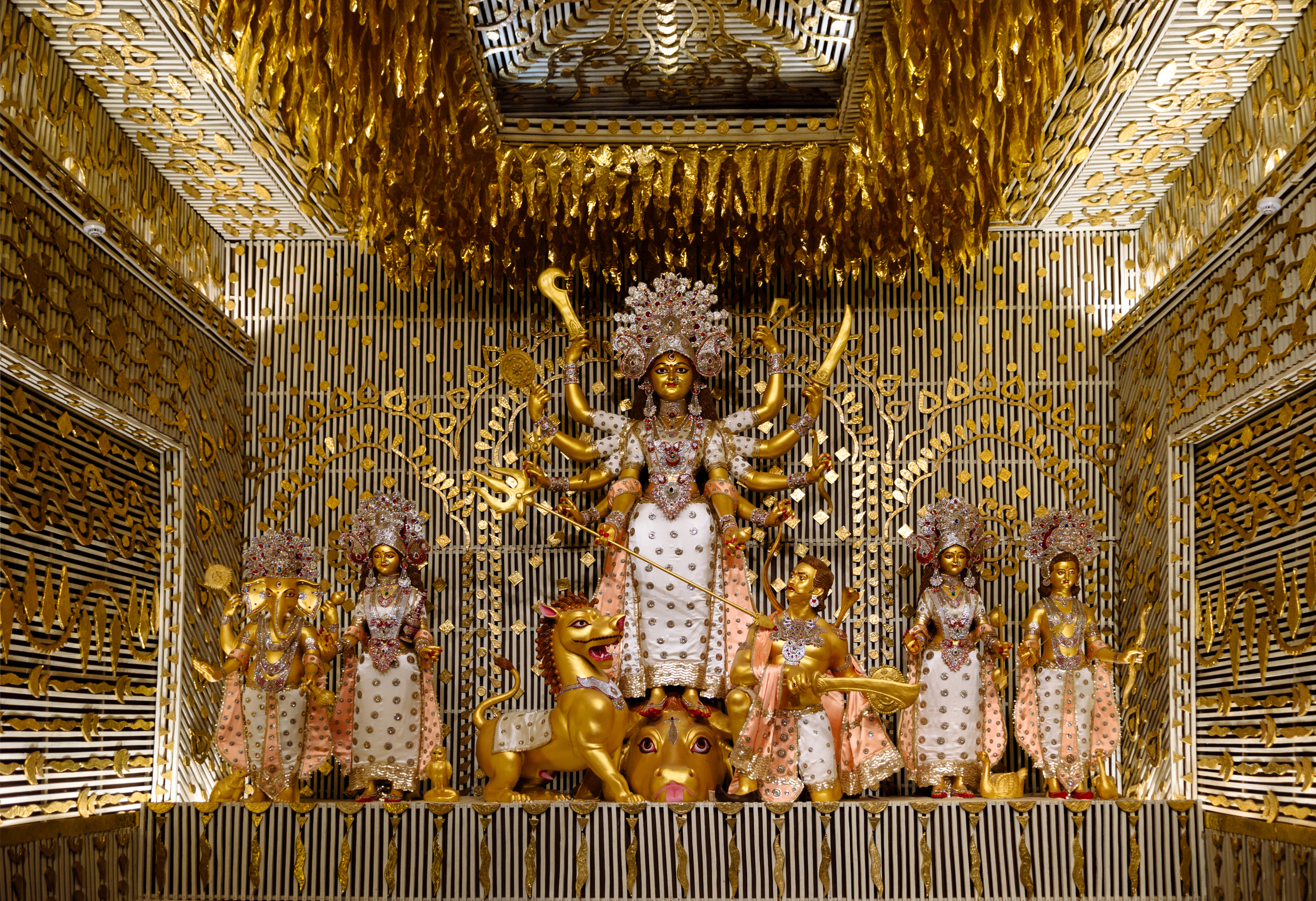
Manicktalla Chaltabagan Lohapatty Durga Pujo 2019

The Durga Puja is held near the intersection of Vivekananda Road and Amherst Street. Environmentalism is a common theme of the Manicktalla Chaltabagan Lohapatty Durga Puja, which used a windmill and solar panels to power the lighting.

The committee organizing the Durga Puja is headed by President Late Lakhi Chand Jaiswal and Chairman Sandeep Bhutoria. It has supported various charitable causes, including a donation of ₹50,000 to disaster relief for victims of Cyclone Aila in 2009 and ₹100,000 towards the relief fund of Governor of West Bengal M. K. Narayanan in 2010.

The Manicktalla Chaltabagan Lohapatty Durga Puja has won the Asian Paints Sharad Shamman award for Best Puja in 1997 and for Best Artisan (Nepal Pal and Gouranga Pal) in 2002. In 2010 it was introduced into the True Spirit Puja Hall of Fame.

2016

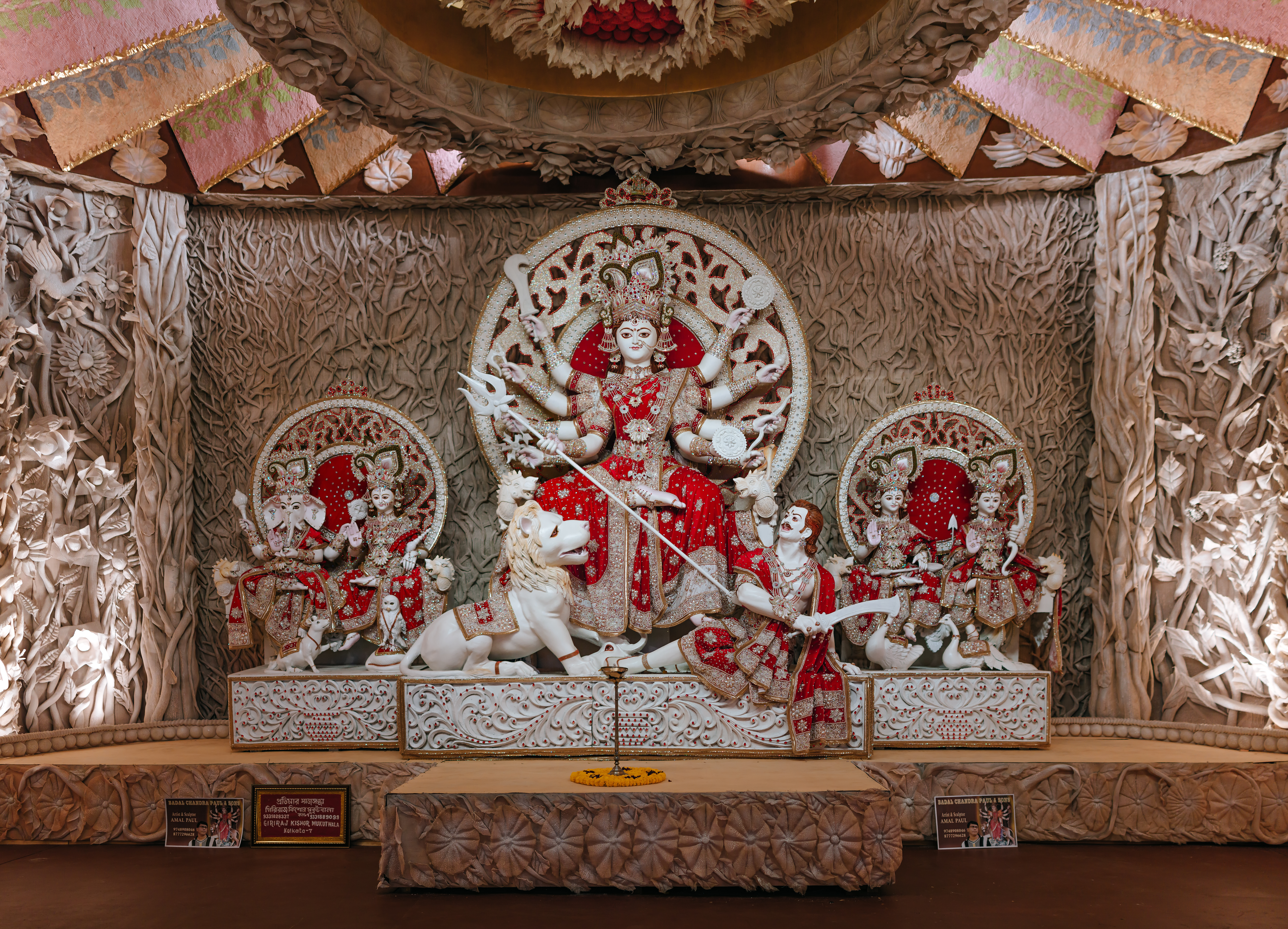
2017

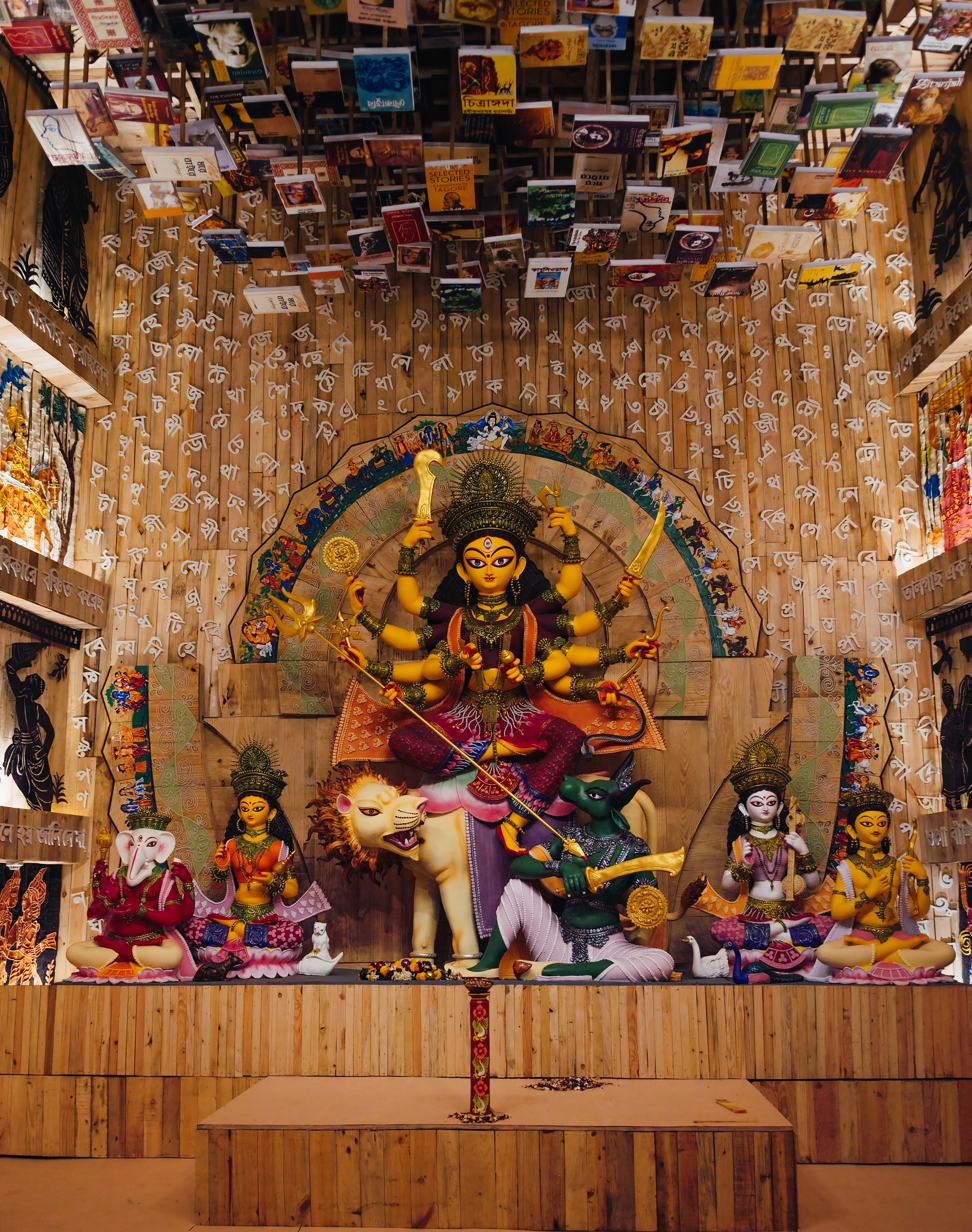
2018

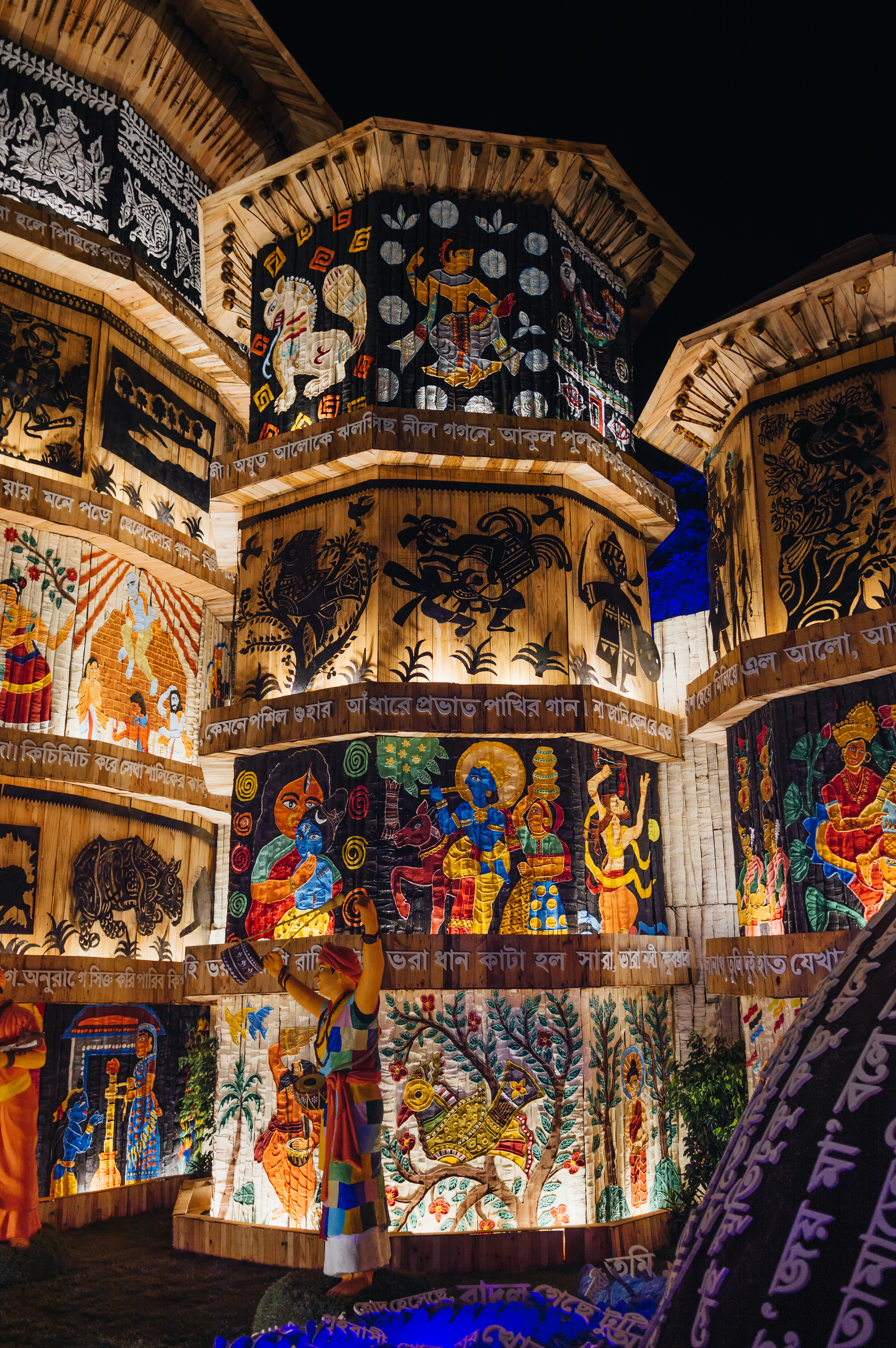
2018
