= Mahajati Sadan =

Building in Kolkata, India

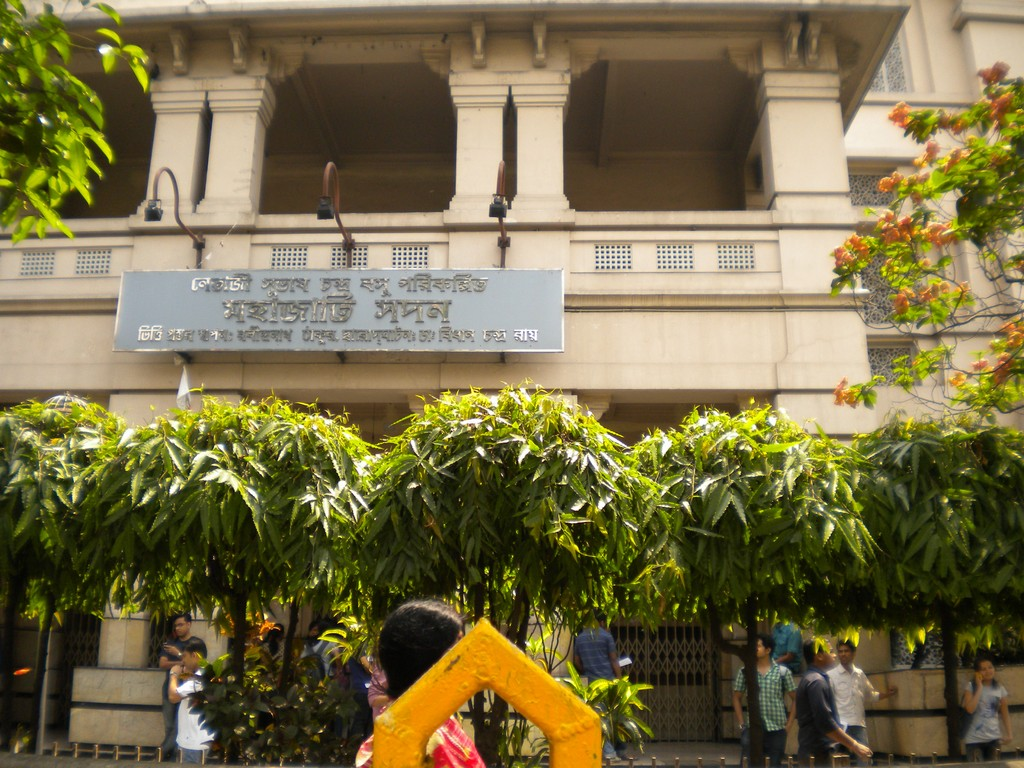
- Mahajati Sadan, Kolkata
- Interactive map of the Mahajati Sadan area

General information
- Status: Active
- Location: 166, Chittaranjan Avenue, Kolkata – 700007, Kolkata, India
- Inaugurated: 19 August 1939
- Owner: West Bengal Government

Mahajati Sadan is an auditorium located on Chittaranjan Avenue in Kolkata, West Bengal, India. This auditorium is regularly used for Bengali theatres. Seminars are also organized in the seminal hall of Mahajati Sadan. This auditorium was an important part of India's freedom movement. Rabindranath Tagore called this auditorium "House of the Nation".

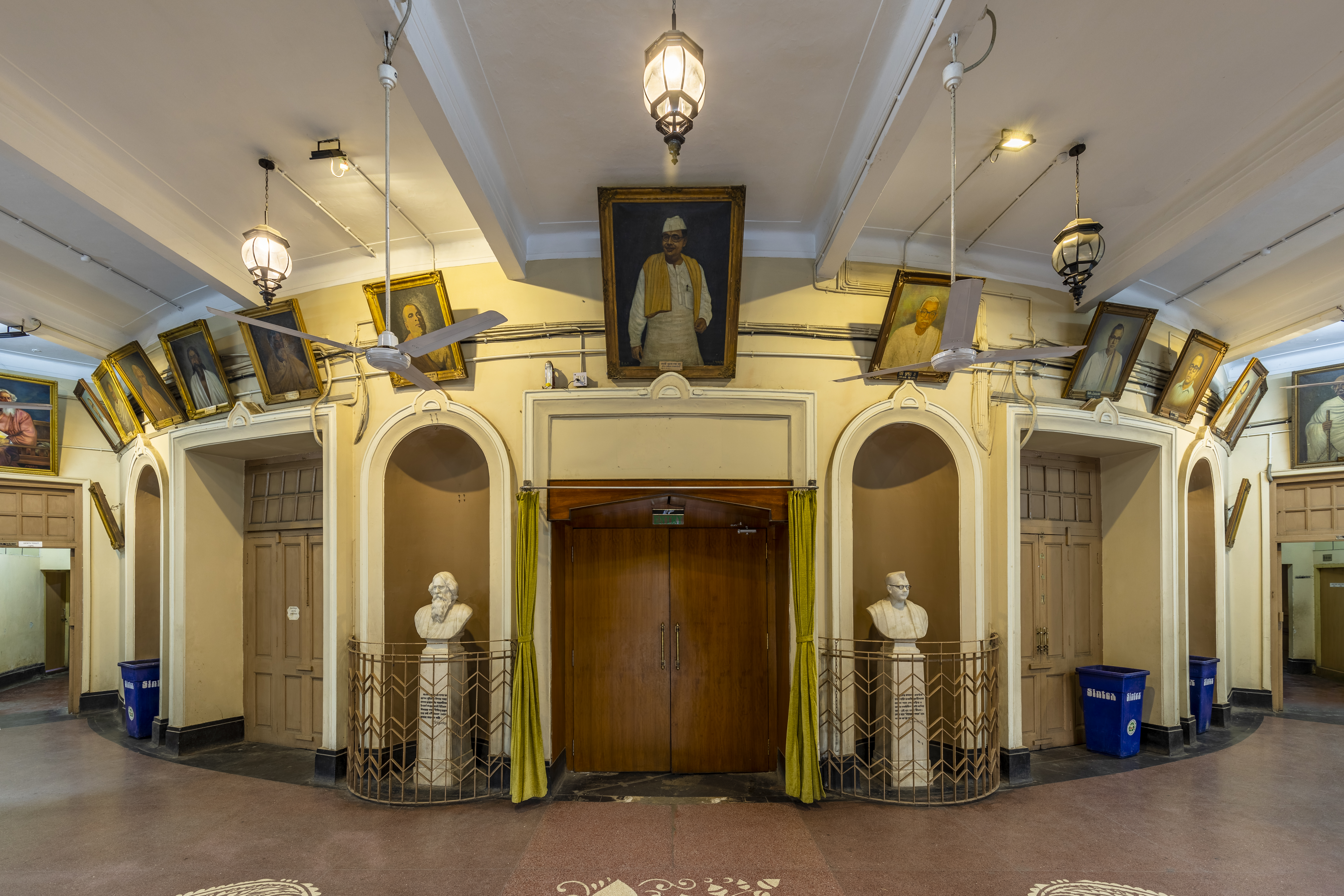
Mahajati Sadan Entrance

== History ==
Subhas Chandra Bose made a request to Rabindranath Tagore to create an auditorium and in response to the request of Bose, Tagore laid the foundation stone of Mahajati Sadan 19 August 1939. At the foundation-laying ceremony of Mahajati Sadan, Tagore told in his speech:

Today we assemble here to witness the beginning of the fulfilment of a long cherished dream. Those who for years have toiled and suffered – laboured and sacrificed – so that India may be free, have long wished an abode to provide shelter and protection for their activities and to serve as a visible symbol of their hopes and ideal-dreams and aspirations. More than once has the attempt been made to give us the home that we have wanted, but it has failed and it has been left to you to lay the foundation stone of the 'House of Nation'

But, the disappearance of Bose stopped the construction work of this building. After the independence of India, Bidhan Chandra Roy showed his interest to complete the construction work of this building and thus "Mahajati Sadan Act 1949" was enacted for completion of the construction.
