= 2018 Kolkata bridge collapse =

Indian bridge failure

- Date: 4 September 2018; 7 years ago
- Location: Alipore, Kolkata, India; 22.518°N 88.323°E
- Deaths: 3
- Injuries: 25

The 2018 Kolkata bridge collapse refers to the collapse of the Majerhat Bridge, in the city of Kolkata, India, on 4 September 2018. The bridge collapsed at around 4:45 PM (IST), resulting in the death of three people and injuries to at least 25 others.

== Majerhat Bridge ==
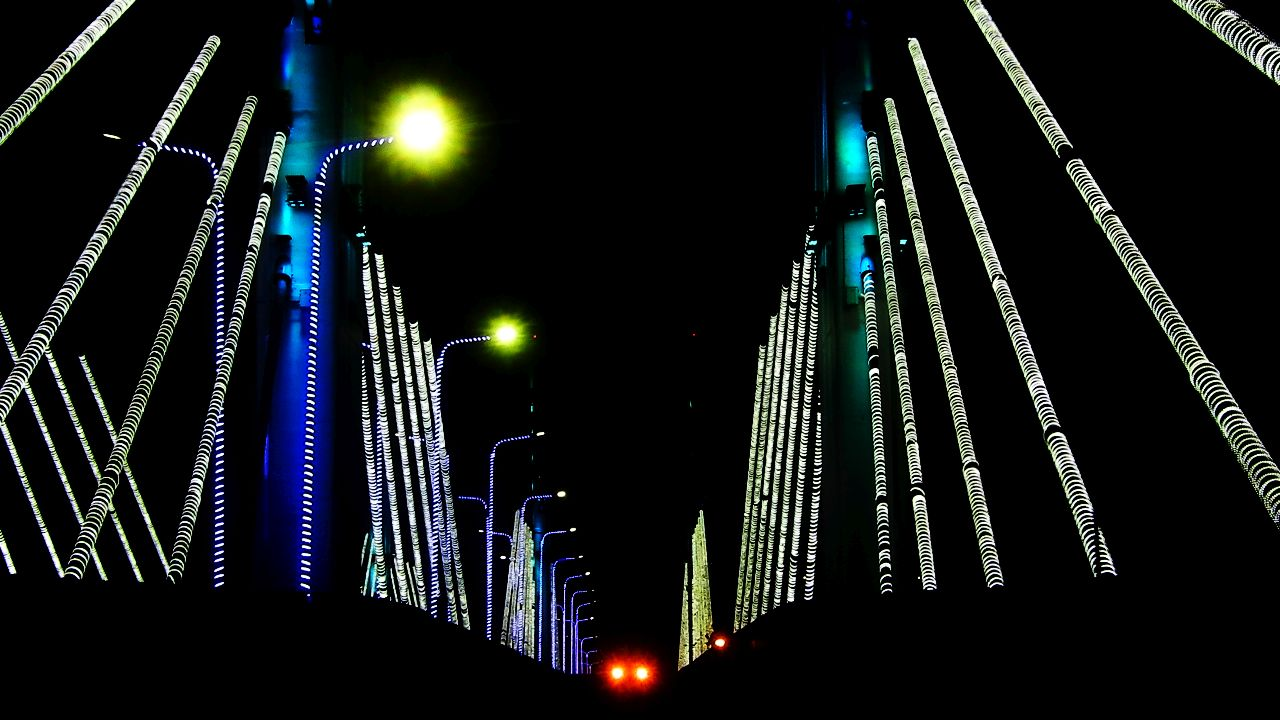
Newly constructed cabled-stayed Majerhat Road Over Bridge reopened after two years

Majerhat Bridge is located at Majerhat, Alipore, a neighbourhood of South Kolkata. It was a major arterial road (Diamond Harbour Road) in the area connecting the southern suburbs to other parts of the city via Behala. It is also part of National Highway 12.

Majerhat railway station is located beside the bridge. There is an adjacent Majerhat metro station for Purple Line. The bridge crosses the Indian Railways Sealdah South local rail network from Sealdah to Budge Budge as well as the Kolkata Circular Railway lines.

== Background ==
There had been concern around the time of the accident that in Kolkata, and in wider India, proper road maintenance was not being undertaken. This incident was the third bridge collapse in Kolkata in six years. On 4 March 2013, part of a flyover in Ultadanga had also collapsed. On 31 March 2016, part of an under-construction flyover had collapsed in central Kolkata's busy Girish Park area. 27 people had died in the tragedy, leaving 80 people gravely injured.

There had been reported concerns about Majerhat Bridge itself. At the time of the collapse the bridge was apparently over 50 years old. In 2010, the Majerhat Bridge had undergone repairs for subsidence. An audit in 2016 flagged the bridge as unsafe. Concerns had been raised in 2018 by police, commuters and nearby residents stemming from visible cracks appearing in the structure.

== Incident ==
The bridge caved in around 4:45 PM. Videos from the locality showed a portion of the bridge resting on the street below including at least nine vehicles, including a minibus, stuck on it.

=== Deaths ===
- Prabir Kumar Dey, a resident of Murshidabad, and a worker on the Purple Line project.
- Soumen Bag, a resident of Behala's Silpara.
- Gautam Mondal, a cook employed in the nearby Purple Line project.

== Rescue efforts ==
The rescue effort was started by the Kolkata Police, an Indian Army unit from Fort William and five special disaster management teams of the NDRF after the mishap. Injured people were sent to nearby SSKM, CMRI and Vidyasagar hospitals for treatment.

== Aftermath ==
After the collapse, Eastern Railways suspended train services via Majerhat railway station on the Kolkata Circular Railway and Sealdah-Budge Budge lines. Widespread road traffic disruption ensued as the bridge was a major route for vehicles moving between north and south Kolkata.

The Chief Minister, Mamata Banerjee asked Chief Secretary Moloy Kumar De to hold an investigation committee into the collapse. She had noted that 20 bridges in the city were at risk of collapse. A Times of India article on 7 September 2018 noted that the Public Works Department has admitted that urgent repairs had not been carried out properly, it was noted that patchwork repairs were carried out on the bridge, adding layers of bitumen, and therefore weight, rather than a thorough repair. The collapse led to a rising distrust among the public regarding the safety of bridges in India.

The safety of bridges in West Bengal has further come under scrutiny, as there have been 3 bridge collapses in September 2018 alone.

Preliminary results of investigations suggest that pollution and poor maintenance contributed to the bridge collapse. Accusations that Metro construction had led to bridge collapse were felt to be unfounded. There have been reports that repairs were hastily completed with claims that "a month's work was done in one night".

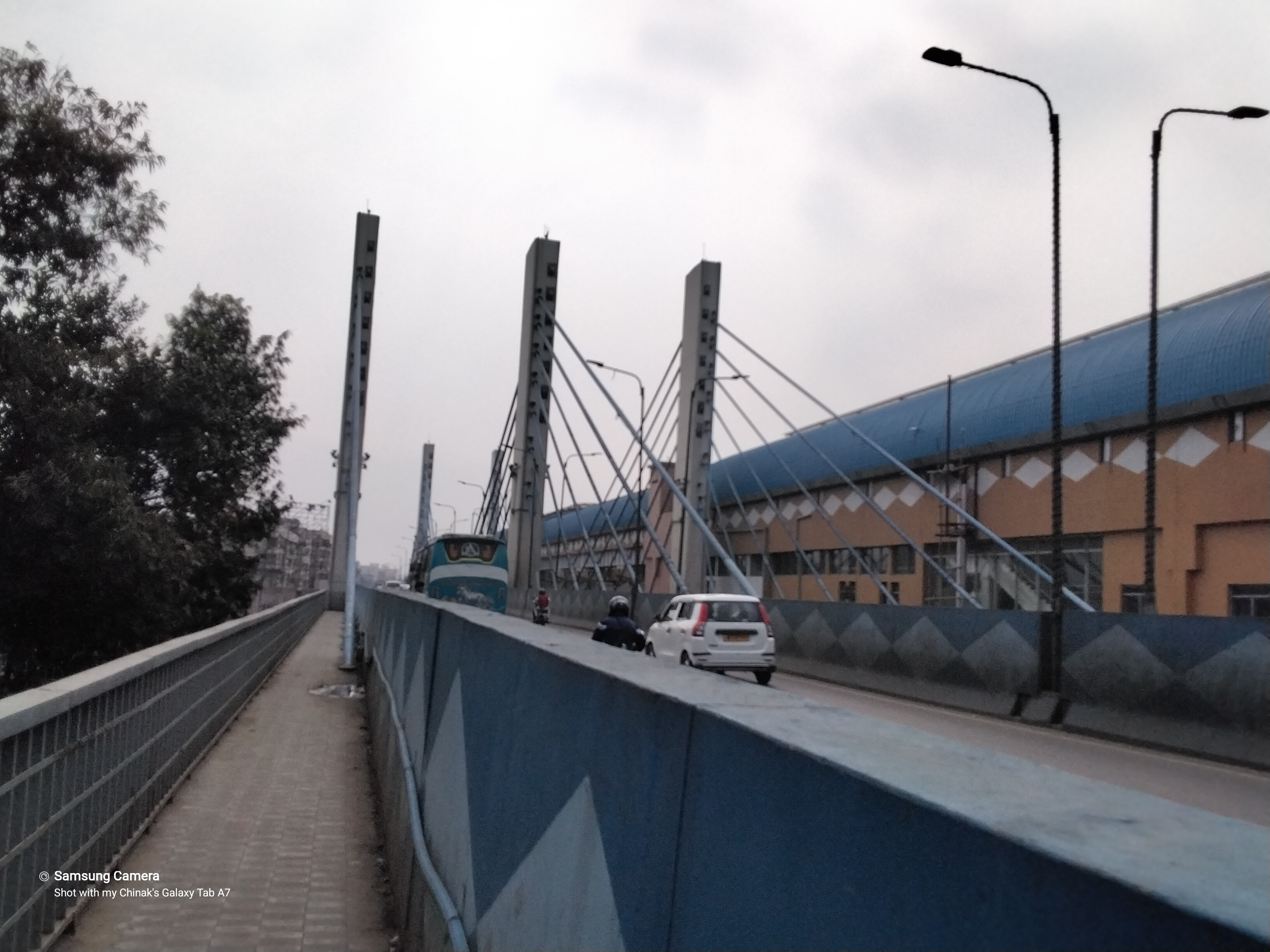
Old Majerhat bridge replacement called Jai Hind Setu

The state public works department (PWD) has undertaken a complete tear down of the old bridge and reconstruction of a new bridge at the same location and is aiming to commission the new bridge in November 2020. The new bridge was opened on 4 December 2020. It was named the Jai Hind Bridge after the Jai Hind slogan used by Subhas Chandra Bose, commemorating his 125th birthday anniversary.

Later Majerhat metro station was also completed and opened on 6 March 2024.

== Reactions ==
- Mamata Banerjee, Chief Minister of West Bengal – said after the accident that the priorities are relief and rescue with the investigation commencing later. She also announced a compensation of ₹5 lakh (equivalent to ₹6.7 lakh or US$7,000 in 2023) to the family of each deceased, and ₹50,000 (equivalent to ₹66,892 in 2023) each to the injured.
- Narendra Modi, Prime Minister of India – tweeted that the loss of lives in the collapse is deeply unfortunate.
- Rajnath Singh, Union Home Minister – stated that the bridge collapse incident in Kolkata is extremely tragic.
- The Rail Vikas Nigam Limited project manager for the nearby Purple Line construction works, has denied the metro construction led to the bridge collapse.

== See also ==
- Kolkata flyover collapse
- 2010 Commonwealth Games footbridge collapse in Delhi
