= 2016 Kolkata flyover collapse =

Disaster in Kolkata which occurred on 31 March 2016

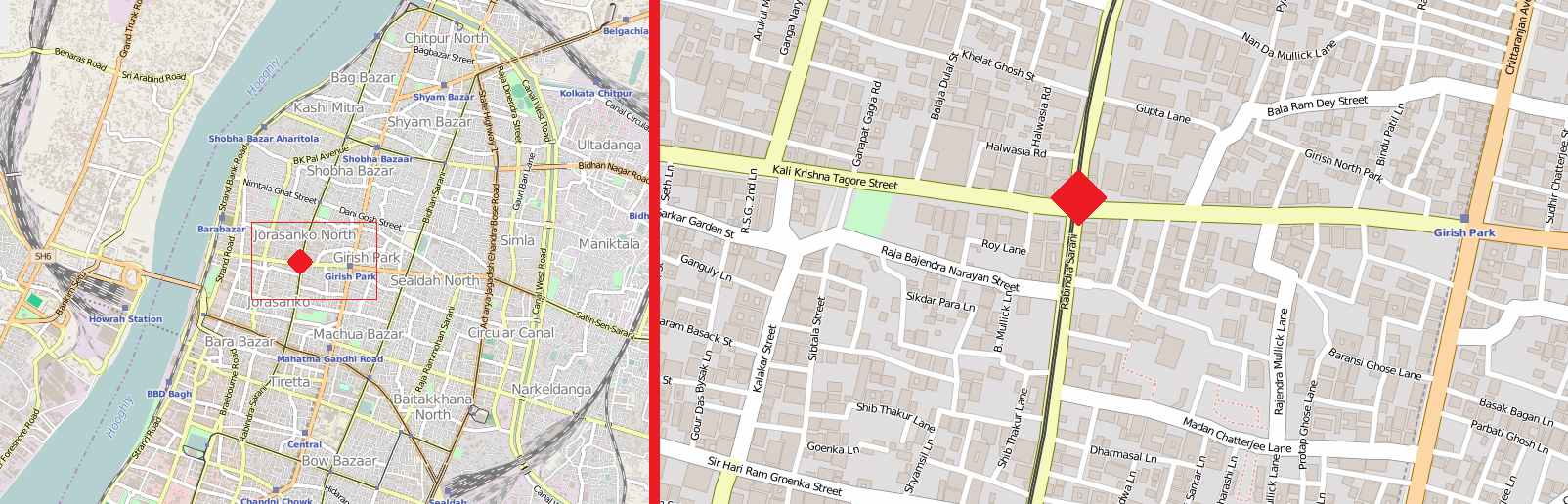
- Kolkata flyover collapse location
- Date: 31 March 2016
- Location: Girish Park, Kolkata, India; 22.586367°N 88.358256°E
- Deaths: 27
- Injuries: 80

On 31 March 2016, a 150-metre (490-foot) steel span of the under-construction Vivekananda Road flyover in the Girish Park neighbourhood of Kolkata, India, collapsed. 27 people died and 80 more were injured in the accident.

== Background ==
The construction for the 2.2-kilometre (1.4 mi) Vivekananda Road flyover was contracted in 2008 and began in 2009. IVRCL, a construction firm based in Hyderabad, won the bid for the project. The construction was scheduled to be completed in 2010 but overshot the deadline multiple times. IVRCL was given an 18-month deadline by the Chief Minister of West Bengal, Mamata Banerjee, to complete the flyover by February 2016 and allocated a budget of nearly ₹165 crore (US$17 million) but only about 60 percent of the work was completed. As of March 2015, IVRCL had a debt of ₹4,055 crore (US$420 million) and reported losses of ₹672 crore (US$70 million). In December 2015, a consortium of banks that had lent to the company took over the company and it was banned from doing business in Uttar Pradesh and several other Indian states.

On 30 March 2016, one day before the collapse, concrete was laid on the bridge. Just hours before the collapse, construction workers were reported to have heard a cracking noise from the cantilever.

== Incident ==
At 12:40 pm IST on 31 March 2016, the bridge collapsed, trapping many pedestrians and vehicles underneath. The incident took place at the busy Rabindra Sarani – K K Tagore road crossing. 27 people were killed and at least 80 others were injured. More than 90 people had been pulled from the rubble, but as of 1 April 2016, over 100 people were still unaccounted for. The National Disaster Response Force (NDRF) worked in relief operations with police and other security personnel. Many photographs and videos were quickly posted on social media platforms.

== Aftermath ==
On 1 April 2016, the construction company IVRCL was charged with murder, under section 302 of the Indian Penal Code. The police detained five IVRCL officials in Kolkata and two in Hyderabad, and sealed off IVRCL's local office in Kolkata. The firm called the collapse an "accident", with one IVRCL official describing it as an "act of god". The shares of the company fell 11.7% the day after the disaster. Sixty-two families living in buildings near the accident site were asked to vacate temporarily for the safe removal of collapsed debris. In a letter sent to BSE, IVRCL claimed that the design of the flyover was done by a reputed consulting firm of Kolkata.

== Potential causes ==
Anandapran Gupta, former head of the department of civil engineering at IIT Kharagpur stated that his investigating committee found defects in multiple aspects of the flyover construction including design, construction, raw materials and supervision. Biranchi Acharya, an experienced construction professional, claimed that the main cause was the failure of a pier cap which brought down two spans supported over it. Some flaws either in joints of pier cap or unwanted eccentric loading may have been responsible.

== Reaction ==
The Chief Minister of West Bengal, Mamata Banerjee, rushed to oversee the post-crash relief and rescue operation, and made a statement accusing the previous left-wing government for the disaster. The previous state government, headed by the Communist Party of India (M), stated that the portion of the flyover that collapsed was built during the current government's tenure. Minister of State for Urban Development, Babul Supriyo, remarked that the construction work of the flyover was carried on in an unscientific manner and "the state administration did not take any lesson even after the collapse of Ultadanga flyover three years ago". The legal advisor to IVRCL, Sheela Peddinti, said "The glass was shattered. It could have been a blast."

The vice-president of the Indian National Congress, Rahul Gandhi, visited the injured and the site of the accident. He refused to make any political statements. Later, he incidentally raised the issue at rallies and accused the ruling party, Trinamool Congress of negligence.

== See also ==
- 2018 Kolkata bridge collapse
- 2014 Surat Flyover collapse during Construction
- 2010 Commonwealth Games footbridge collapse in Delhi
