= Mahatma Gandhi Road metro station (Kolkata) =

Metro station in Kolkata, India

Mahatma Gandhi Road
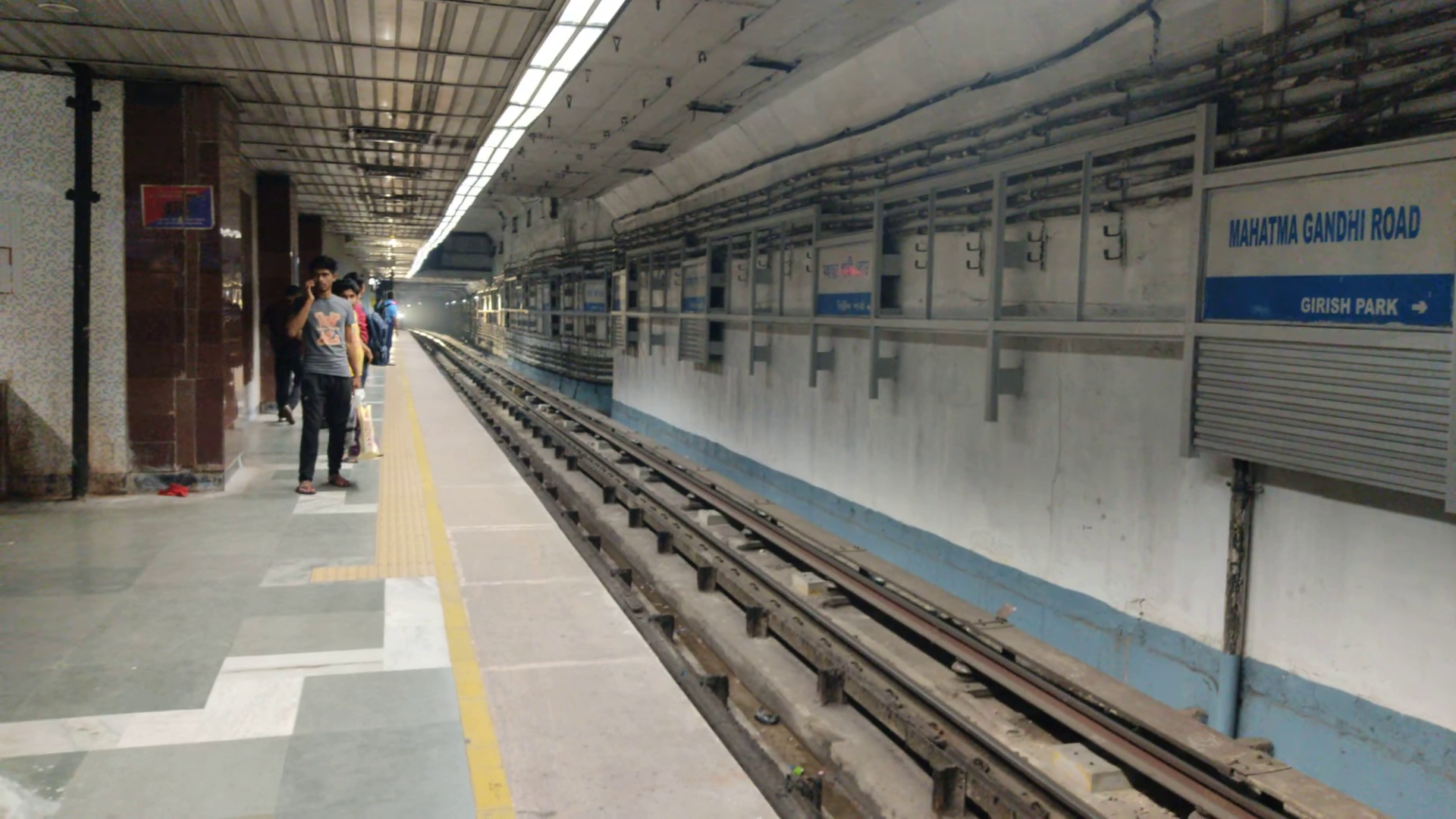

General information
- Location: Chittaranjan Avenue, Jorasanko; Kolkata, West Bengal 700007; India
- Coordinates: 22.58085°N 88.36140°E
- System: Kolkata Metro
- Operator: Metro Railway, Kolkata
- Line: Blue Line
- Platforms: 2 (1 island platform)

Construction
- Structure type: Underground
- Accessible: No

Other information
- Status: Operational
- Station code: KMHR

History
- Opened: 27 September 1995; 30 years ago

Services
Preceding station	Kolkata Metro	Following station
Girish Park towards Dakshineswar	Blue Line	Central towards Shahid Khudiram
Route map
Location

Mahatma Gandhi Road is an underground metro station on the North-South corridor of the Blue Line of Kolkata Metro in Kolkata, West Bengal, India. The station is located on Chittaranjan Avenue, close to Burrabazar.

== Station layout ==
G	Street level	Exit/Entrance
L1	Mezannine	Fare control, station agent, Ticket/token, shops, crossover
L2	Platform 2	Towards Shahid Khudiram (Central) →
L2	Island platform, Doors will open on the right
L2	Platform 1	← Towards Dakshineswar (Girish Park)

== Connections ==
=== Bus ===
Bus route number 3B, 24, 24B, 28, 30B/1, 30C, 39A/2, 43, 44, 44A, 47B, 71, 72, 78, 214, 214A, 215, 215/1, 215A/1, 219, 219/1, 222, 237, L238, 242, 25 (Mini), 27A (Mini), S139 (Mini), S151 (Mini), S152 (Mini), S159 (Mini), S160 (Mini), S161 (Mini), S163 (Mini), S164 (Mini), S172 (Mini), S175 (Mini), S181 (Mini), S184 (Mini), S186 (Mini), C28, E25, E32, M24, MIDI1, S9A, S10, S11, S15G, S17A, S32, S32A, S57, AC2, AC10, AC15, AC20, AC39, AC40, AC54, VS1, VS2 etc. serve the station.

=== Train ===
Sealdah railway station is located nearby.

=== Tram ===
Tram route number 18 serves the station.

== Entry/Exit ==
- 1 – Main Gate
- 2 – Netaji Park
Gate No. 1 of the metro station

== See also ==
- Kolkata
- List of Kolkata Metro stations
- Transport in Kolkata
- Kolkata Metro Rail Corporation
- Kolkata Suburban Railway
- Kolkata Monorail
- Trams in Kolkata
- Bhowanipore
- Chowringhee Road
- List of rapid transit systems
- List of metro systems
