= Girish Park metro station =

Metro station in Kolkata, India

Girish Park
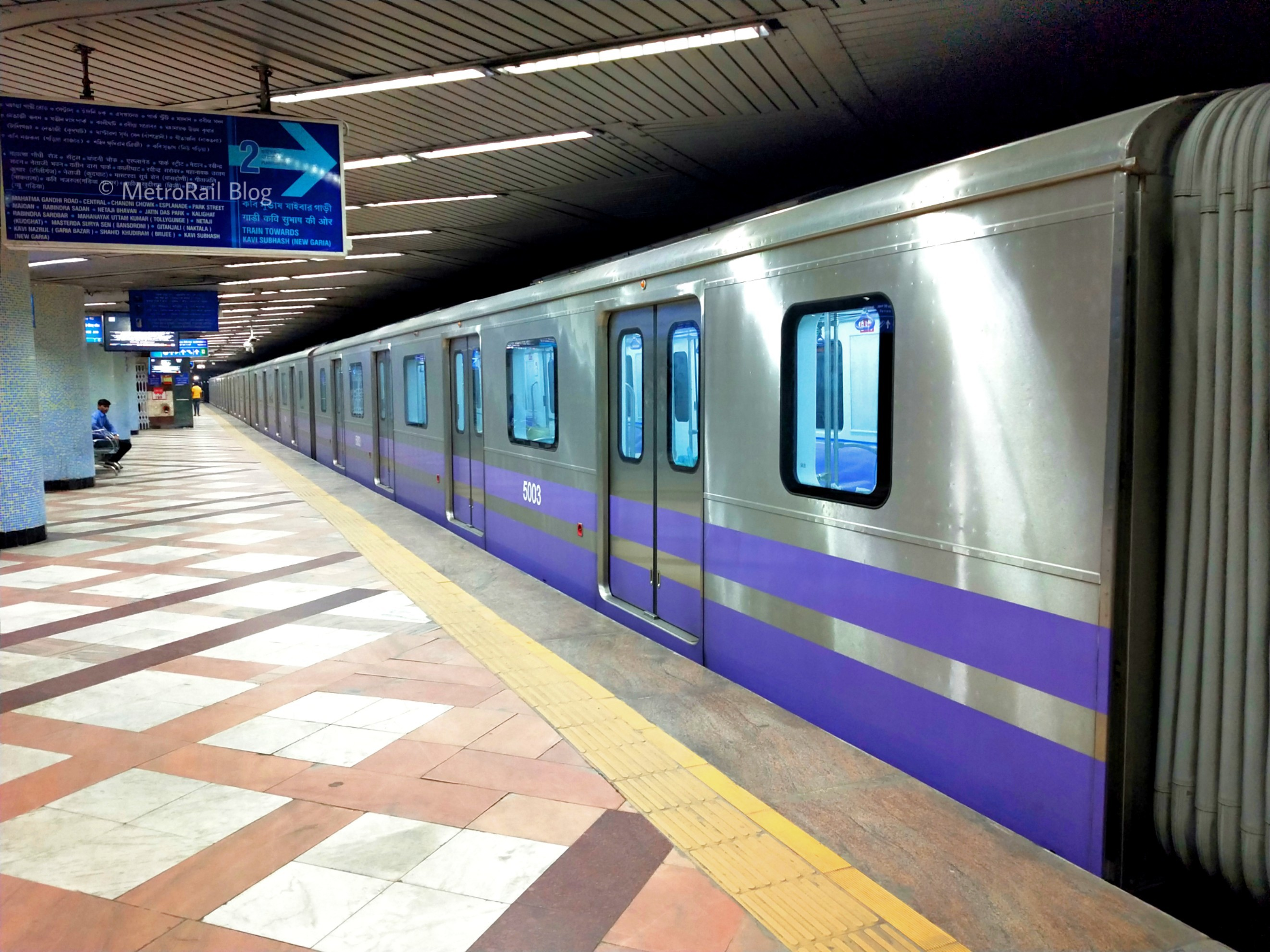
- Kolkata Metro CRRC Dalian rake at Girish Park metro station

General information
- Location: Girish Park crossing, Chittaranjan Ave; Kolkata, West Bengal 700006; India
- Coordinates: 22.58714°N 88.36308°E
- System: Kolkata Metro
- Operator: Metro Railway, Kolkata
- Line: Blue Line
- Platforms: 2 (1 island platform)

Construction
- Structure type: Underground
- Accessible: No

Other information
- Status: Operational
- Station code: KGPK

History
- Opened: 15 February 1995; 31 years ago

Services
Preceding station	Kolkata Metro	Following station
Sovabazar Sutanuti towards Dakshineswar	Blue Line	Mahatma Gandhi Road towards Shahid Khudiram
Route map
Location

Girish Park is an underground metro station on the north–south corridor of the Blue Line of Kolkata Metro which is close to Girish Park in Jorasanko, Kolkata, West Bengal, India.

== History ==
In 2024, Metro Railway commenced a significant upgrade at the station by replacing the steel third rail with an aluminum rail on the Blue Line. This enhancement aims to save energy and reduce operational costs. The aluminum rail's superior conductivity is expected to reduce voltage drops, leading to faster train acceleration and shorter travel times. The project began with preparatory work at night to avoid disrupting daily services and is part of a larger initiative to modernize the entire 35 km stretch of the Blue Line over the next two years.

Additionally, the new aluminum third rail will reduce energy loss by 84%, saving approximately ₹1 crore per kilometer annually and cutting carbon emissions by 50,000 tons over its lifetime. The upgrade includes installing additional substations to support the enhanced train frequency, bringing Kolkata Metro in line with global standards.

== Station layout ==
G	Street level	Exit/Entrance
L1	Mezannine	Fare control, station agent, Ticket/token, shops, crossover
L2	Platform 2	Towards Shahid Khudiram (Mahatma Gandhi Road) →
L2	Island platform, Doors will open on the right
L2	Platform 1	← Towards Dakshineswar (Sovabazar Sutanuti)

== Entry/Exit ==
- 1 / 2 – Main Gate
- 3 – Vivekananda Road
Gate No. 1 of the metro station

Gate No. 2 of the metro station

Gate No. 3 of the metro station along with the Girish Park Traction substation of Kolkata Metro

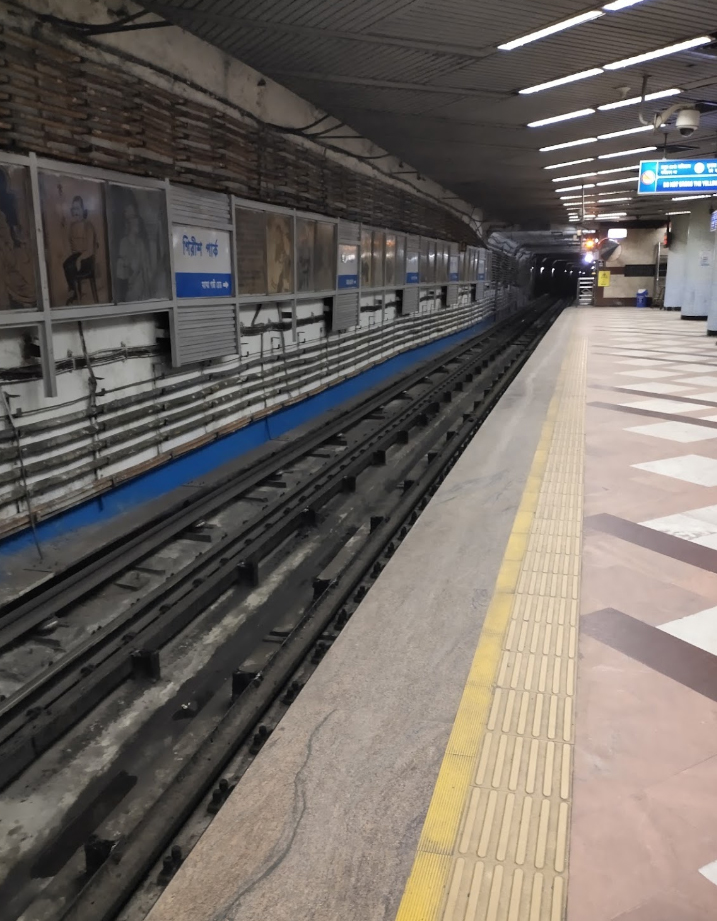
Girish Park MG Road bound platform

== Connections ==
=== Bus ===
Bus route number 3B, 30C, 43, 47B, 78, 214, 214A, 215/1, 215A/1, 219/1, 222, 237, L238, 242, 13 (Mini), 13A (Mini), 20 (Mini), 20A (Mini), 29 (Mini), S139 (Mini), S151 (Mini), S152 (Mini), S159 (Mini), S160 (Mini), S161 (Mini), S163 (Mini), S164 (Mini), S172 (Mini), S175 (Mini), S181 (Mini), S184 (Mini), C28, E25, E32, S9A, S10, S11, S15G, S17A, S32, S32A, S57, AC2, AC10, AC20, AC39, AC40, AC54, VS1, VS2 etc. serve the station.

== See also ==
- Kolkata
- List of Kolkata Metro stations
- Transport in Kolkata
- Kolkata Metro Rail Corporation
- Kolkata Suburban Railway
- Kolkata Monorail
- Trams in Kolkata
- Chittaranjan Avenue
- Maniktala
- List of rapid transit systems
- List of metro systems
