= Vivekananda Road =

Road in Kolkata, India

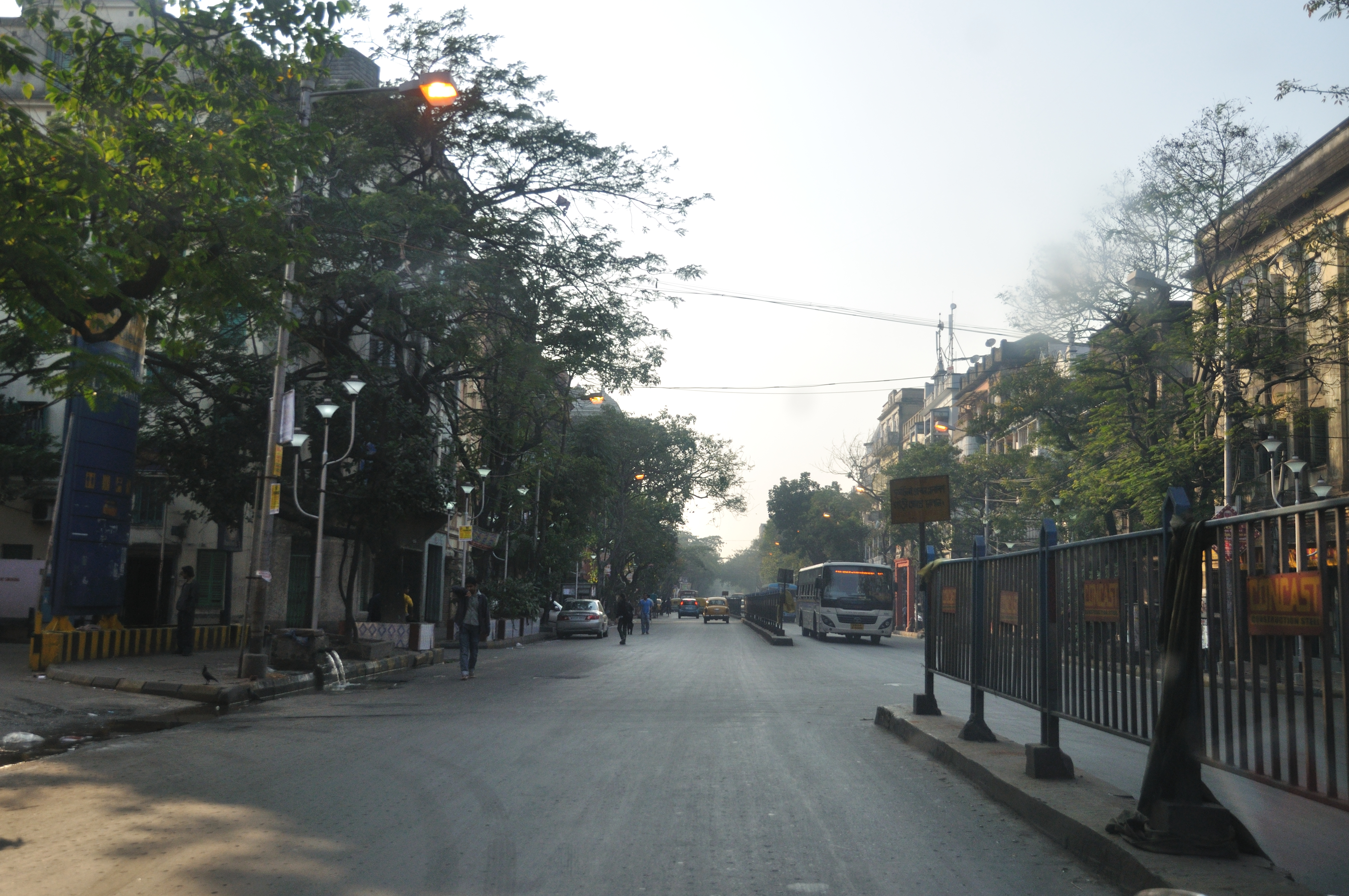
- Maintained by: Kolkata Municipal Corporation
- Location: Kolkata, India
- Postal code: 700006, 700007
- Nearest Kolkata Metro station: Girish Park
- west end: Ganesh Talkies
- east end: Maniktala Police Station

Vivekananda Road is a major east–west thoroughfare in Kolkata which connects Maniktala with Jorasanko. To the West of Maniktala Police Station, Maniktala Main Road becomes Vivekananda Road. The name of the road is a tribute to Swami Vivekananda's Ancestral House which is located near Bidhan Sarani Crossing.

Vivekananda Road consists of several important places, such as APC Road crossing, Amherst Street crossing, Bidhan Sarani crossing, Chittaranjan Avenue crossing and Rabindra Sarani crossing.

On 31 March 2016, a flyover under construction on Vivekananda Road near Girish Park in Burrabazar collapsed, killing 22 people and trapping hundreds.

== Gallery ==
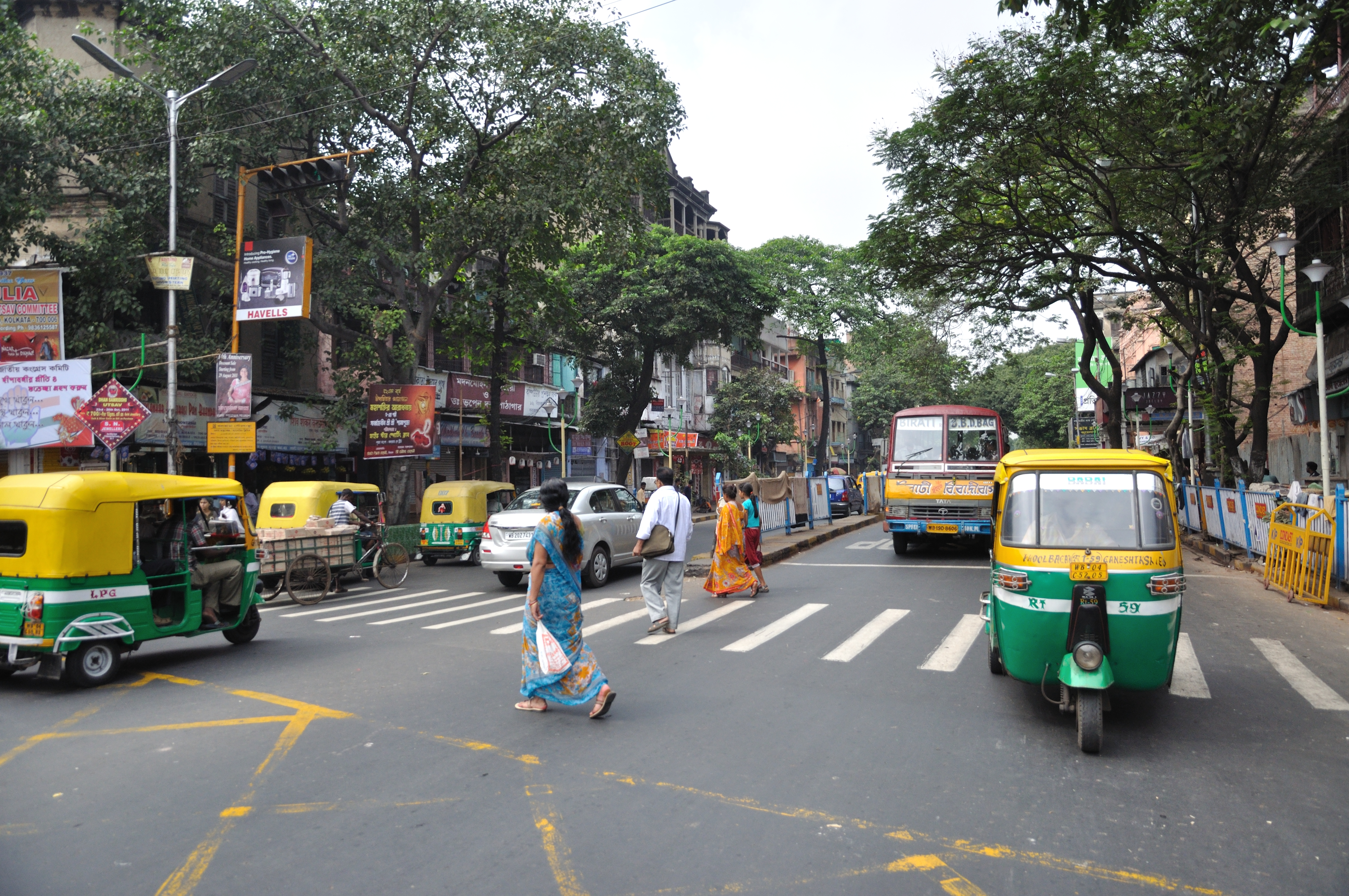
Vivekananda Road and Bidhan Sarani Crossing

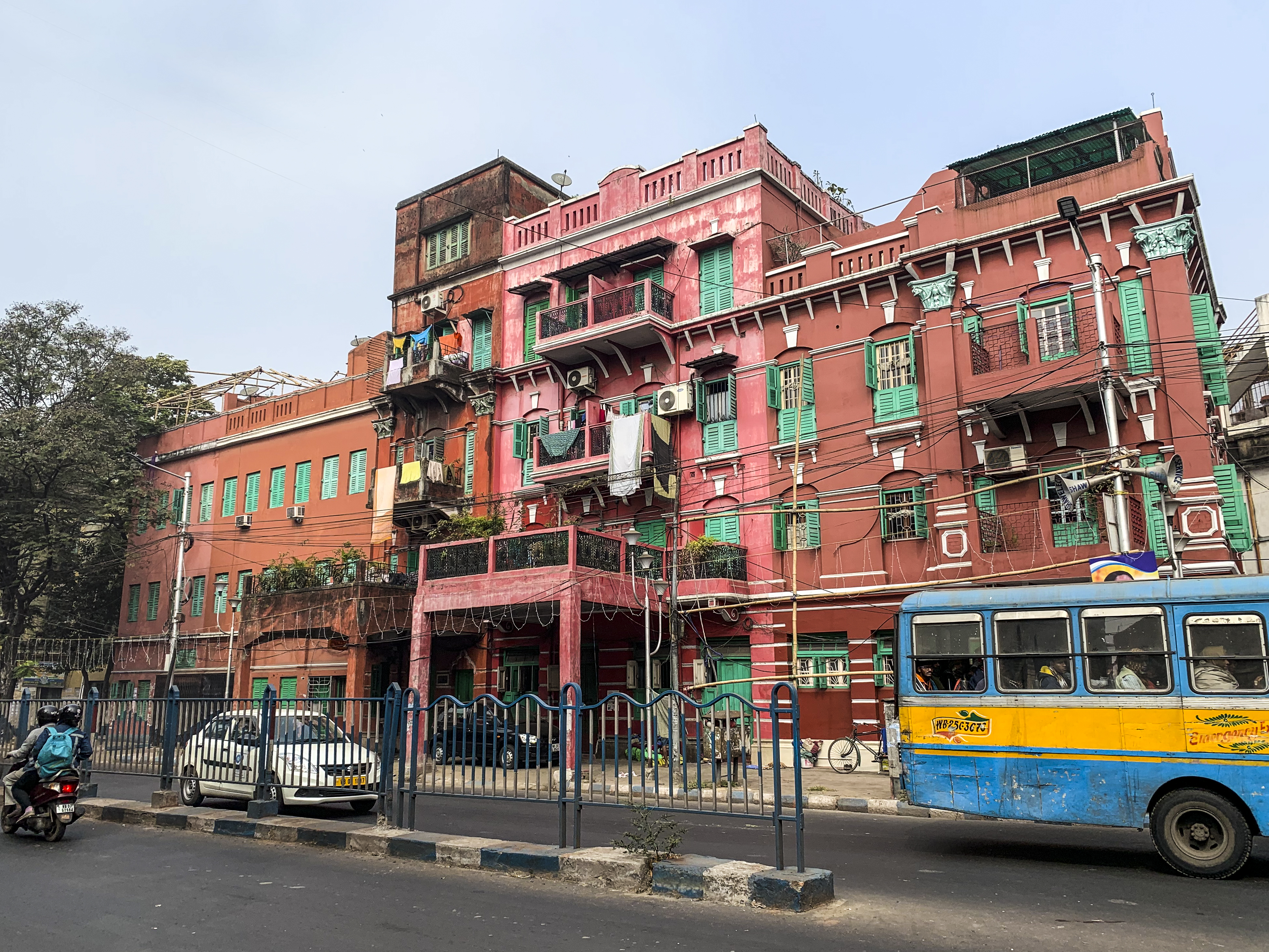
Saha House on Vivekananda Road

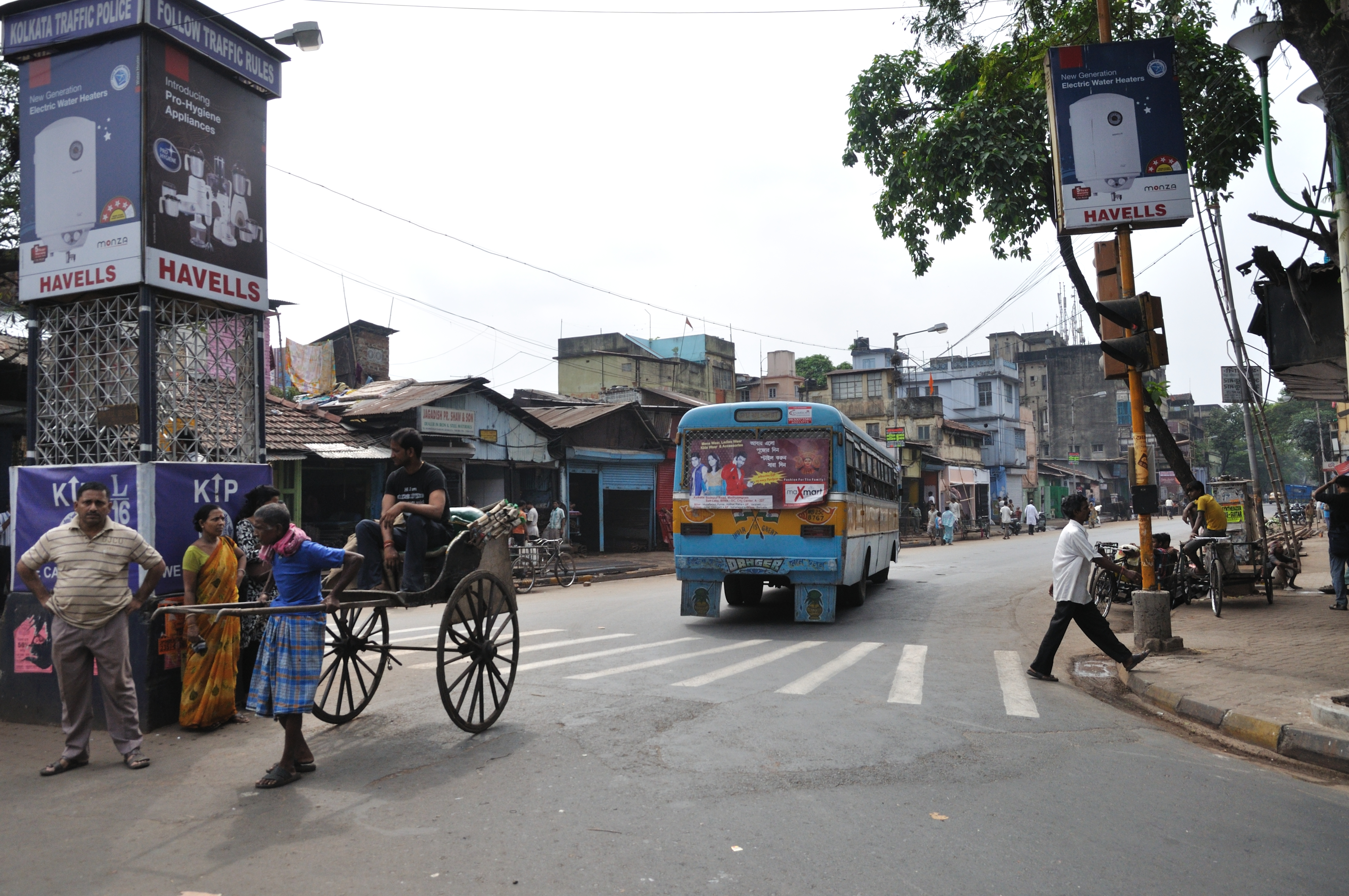
Vivekananda Road and Amherst Street Crossing

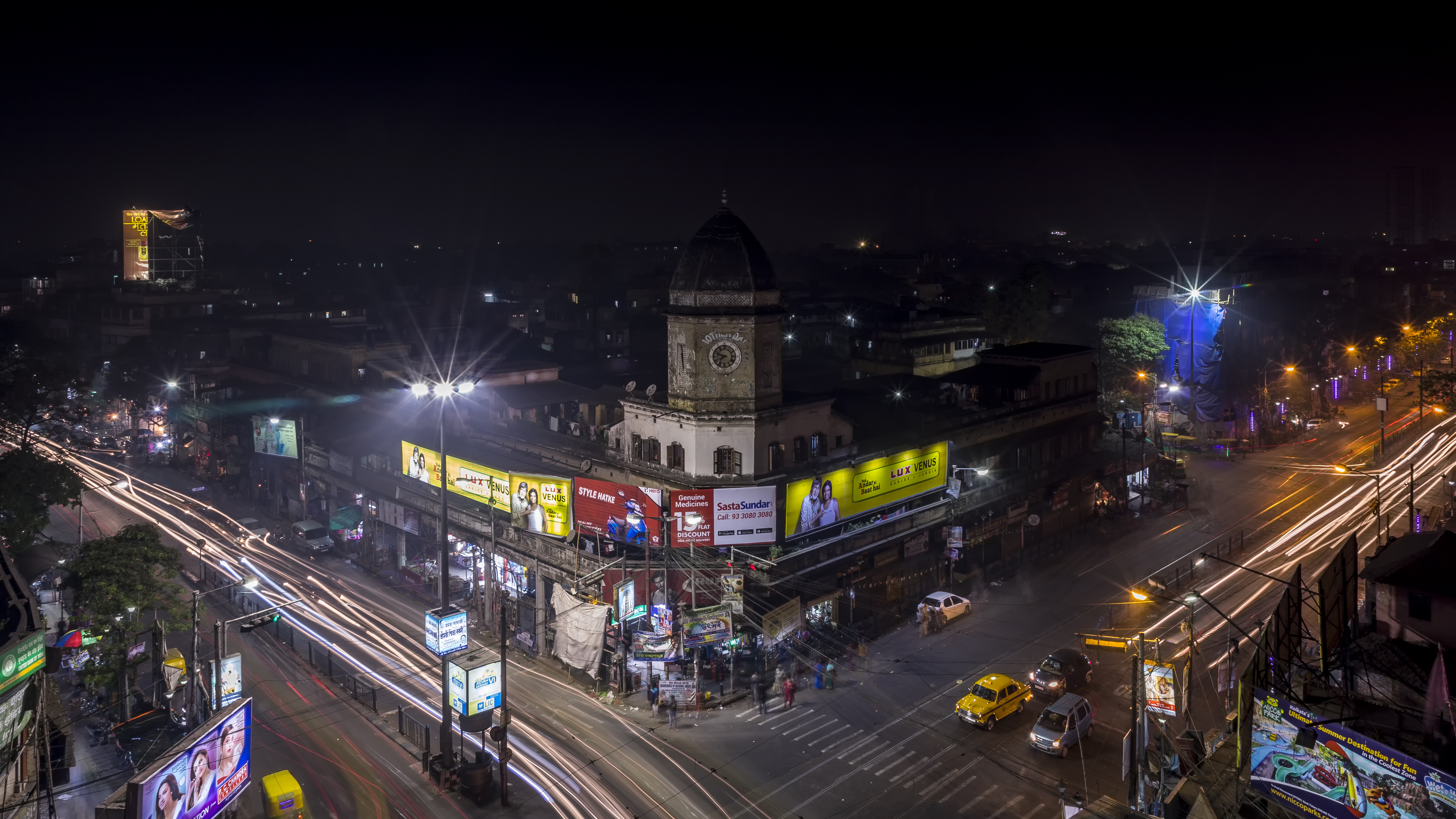
Vivekananda Road and APC Road Crossing, night view
