= Girish Park =

- Neighbourhood in Kolkata (Calcutta)
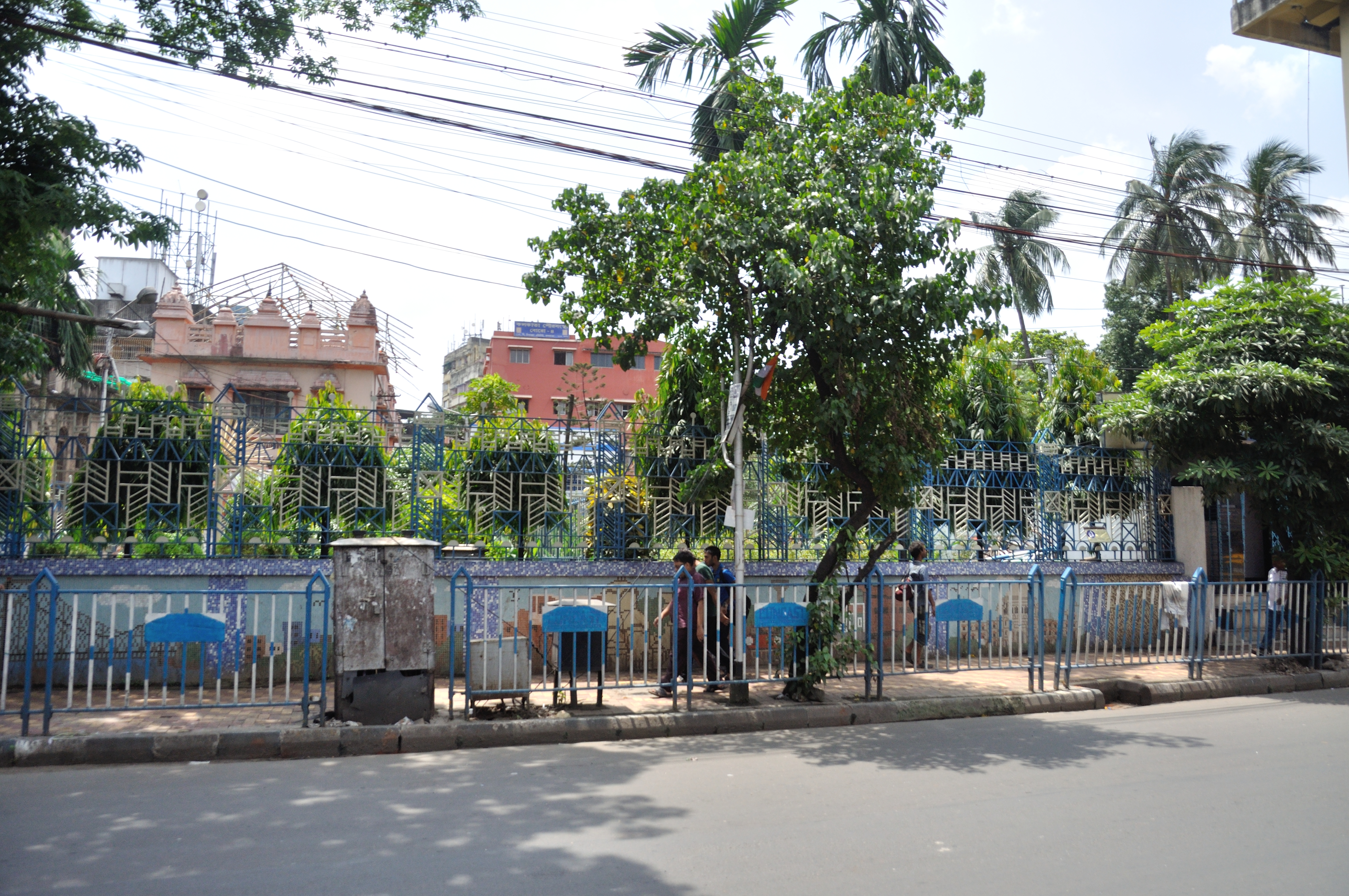

- Location in Kolkata
- Coordinates: 22.586461°N 88.362151°E
- Country: India
- State: West Bengal
- City: Kolkata
- District: Kolkata
- Metro Station: Girish Park
- Municipal Corporation: Kolkata Municipal Corporation
- KMC ward: 25

Population
  - Total: For population see linked KMC ward page
- Time zone: UTC+5:30 (IST)
- Area code: +91 33
- Lok Sabha constituency: Kolkata Uttar
- Vidhan Sabha constituency: Jorasanko

Girish Park is a neighbourhood of North Kolkata in Kolkata district in the Indian state of West Bengal. it is named after famous Bengali Theatre personnel Girish Chandra Ghosh.

== Geography ==
=== Police district ===
Girish Park police station is part of the Central division of Kolkata Police. It is located at 138, Ram Dulal Sarkar Street, Kolkata-700006.

Taltala Women police station covers all police districts under the jurisdiction of the Central division, i.e. Bowbazar, Burrabazar, Girish Park, Hare Street, Jorasanko, Muchipara, New Market, Taltala and Posta.

== Flyover collapse ==
In the Vivekananda flyover collapse, when a portion of the under-construction flyover collapsed in the Girish Park neighbourhood on 31 March 2016, 81 persons were killed and 205 injured.

== Transport ==
=== Road ===
Girish Park is the junction of Chittaranjan Avenue and Vivekananda Road. Beadon Street (Dani Ghosh Sarani/Abhedananda Road) also intersects Chittaranjan Avenue nearby. Many buses ply along these roads.

WBTC Bus

- AC 54 (Rathtala - Howrah Stn)
- S 9A (Dunlop - Ballygunge Stn)
- E-32 (Nilgunge Depot - Howrah Stn)
- AC 54B (Barrackpore - Howrah Stn)
- AC 20 (Barrackpore - Santragachi)
- S 10 (Airport - Nabanna)
- S 17A (Dakshineswar - Kudghat)
- AC 40 (Airport - Howrah Maidan)
- S 11 (Barrackpore - Esplanade)
- S 57 (Ariadaha - Nabanna)
- S 32 (Barrackpore - Howrah Stn)

=== Train ===
Burra Bazar railway station and Sealdah Station are the nearest railway stations.
