= Divisions of Kolkata Police =

Administrative division of Kolkata Police

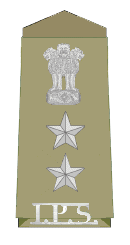
Insignia of Deputy Commissioner of Police

Kolkata Police is divided into nine administrative divisions. Each division is under a Deputy Commissioner of Police.

== North and North Suburban Division ==
With its divisional head office at 113, Acharya Prafulla Chandra Road, Kolkata-700009, the North and North Suburban Division has the following police stations:

Police station	Established	Area covered km^{2}	KMC wards covered	Neighbourhoods covered
Cossipore	n/a	n/a	1	Cossipore
Sinthee	n/a	n/a	2	Sinthee
Tala	n/a	n/a	3, 4, 5	Tala, Belgachia, Paikpara
Chitpur	n/a	n/a	6	Chitpur
Shyampukur	1785 or earlier	n/a	7, 8, 9, 10	Bagbazar, Shyambazar, Shyampukur, Shobhabazar, Kumortuli
Burtolla	1888 or earlier	n/a	11, 15, 16, 17, 18, 26, 27	Burtolla, Shyambazar, Hatibagan, Maniktala, Goabagan, Shobhabazar, Darjipara, Ram Dulal Sarkar Street
Jorabagan	1888 or earlier	n/a	19, 20, 21, 24	Jorabagan, Shobhabazar, Ahiritola, Pathuriaghata,
Amherst Street	n/a	n/a	27, 37, 38, 40	Amherst Street, Maniktala, Sealdah, Naren Sen Square
Amherst Street Women	n/a	n/a	Entire North and North Suburban Division	

== Eastern Suburban Division ==
With its divisional head office at 105, Hem Chandra Naskar Road, Kolkata-700010, the Eastern Suburban Division has the following police stations:

Police station	Established	Area covered km^{2}	KMC wards covered	Neighbourhoods covered
Ultadanga	n/a	n/a	12, 13	Ultadanga
Maniktala	n/a	n/a	13, 14, 15, 32	Maniktala, Ultadanga, Bagmari, Kankurgachi
Narkeldanga	n/a	n/a	28, 29, 30, 35, 36	Narkeldanga, Maniktala, Rajabazar, Garpar, Kankurgachi, Beliaghata, Sealdah
Phoolbagan	n/a	n/a	30, 31, 33	Phoolbagan, Kankurgachi, Bagmari
Beliaghata	n/a	n/a	33, 34, 35	Beliaghata, Phoolbagan
Entally	1888 or earlier	n/a	54, 55	Entally
Tangra	n/a	n/a	57, 58	Tangra, Dhapa
Ultadanga Women	n/a	n/a	Entire Eastern Suburban Division	

== Central Division ==
With its divisional head office at 138, Surendranath Banerjee Road, Kolkata-700013, the Central Division has the following police stations:

Police station	Established	Area covered km^{2}	KMC wards covered	Neighbourhoods covered
Posta	n/a	n/a	22, 23	Posta, Jorasanko,
Girish Park	n/a	n/a	25, 26	Girish Park, Rambagan
Jorasanko	1785 or earlier	n/a	25, 26, 39, 41, 43, 44	Jorasanko, Marcus Square, College Street, Burrabazar
Muchipara	1888 or earlier	n/a	20, 48, 49, 50, 51	Sealdah, Bowbazar, College Square, Moulali
Burrabazar	1888 or earlier	n/a	42	Burrabazar
Bowbazar	1888 or earlier	n/a	44, 46, 47	Bowbazar, Kolutola, Dharmatala
Hare Street	n/a	n/a	45, 46	Esplanade, B.B.D. Bagh, Chowringhee
Taltala	n/a	n/a	46, 51, 52, 53, 62, 63	Taltala, Dharmatala, Park Street
New Market	n/a	n/a	52	Janbazar
Taltala Women	n/a	n/a	Entire Central Division	

== South Division ==
With its divisional head office at 34, Park Street, Kolkata-700016, the South Division has the following police stations:

Police station	Established	Area covered km^{2}	KMC wards covered	Neighbourhoods covered
Park Street	n/a	n/a	61, 62, 63	Park Street, Eliot Road, Ripon Street
Shakespeare Sarani	n/a	n/a	63	Shakespeare Sarani
Maidan	n/a	n/a	46, 63	Maidan
Bhowanipore	1888 or earlier	n/a	70, 71, 72, 73	Bhowanipore
Kalighat	n/a	n/a	71, 73, 83	Kalighat, Bhowanipore
Alipore	1888 or earlier	n/a	74	Alipore
Hastings	1888 or earlier	n/a	75	Hastings
Tollygunge	1888 or earlier Common with Ballygunge when established	n/a	84, 87, 88	Tollygunge, Kalighat, Ballygunge, Lake Market, Mudiali
New Alipore	n/a	n/a	81	New Alipore
Charu Market	n/a	n/a	81, 89	Tollygunge, Tollygunge Circular Road
Chetla	n/a	n/a	82	Chetla
Tollygunge Women's police station	n/a	n/a	Entire South Division	

== South East Division ==
With its divisional head office at Park Court, 2, Syed Amir Ali Avenue, Kolkata-700017, the South East Division has the following police stations:

Police station	Established	Area covered km^{2}	KMC wards covered	Neighbourhoods covered
Beniapukur	1888 or earlier	n/a	54, 55, 56, 57, 59, 60, 61, 64	Beniapukur, Entally, Beliaghata, Park Circus, Nonapukur
Tiljala	n/a	n/a	57, 58, 65, 66, 67, 107, 108	Tiljala, Picnic Garden, Tangra, Kasba
Topsia	n/a	n/a	59, 66	Topsia, Park Circus
Kareya	n/a	n/a	64, 65	Park Circus, Bondel Road
Gariahat	n/a	n/a	68, 85, 86	Gariahat, Ballygunge
Ballygunge	1888 or earlier Common with Tollygunge when established	n/a	69	Ballygunge
Lake	n/a	n/a	85, 86, 93	Ballygunge, Jodhpur Park, Lake Gardens
Rabindra Sarobar	2018	n/a	90	Golpark, Ballygunge
Karaya Women	n/a	n/a	Entire South East Division	

== South Suburban Division ==
With its divisional head office at 5, Moore Avenue, Manik Bandyopadhyay Sarani Rd, Regent Park, Kolkata, West Bengal 700040, the South Suburban Division has the following police stations:

Police station	Established	Area covered km^{2}	KMC wards covered	Neighbourhoods covered
Kasba	n/a	n/a	67, 91, 92 107	Kasba, Selimpur
Jadavpur	n/a	n/a	92, 93, 96, 102	Jadavpur, Baghajatin
Netaji Nagar	2014	n/a	98, 99, 100	Netaji Nagar, Naktala, Garia
Golf Green	2021		94, 95	Tollygunge, Golf Green
Regent Park	n/a	n/a	97, 114	Tollygunge, Moore Avenue, Regent Park, Purba Putiary
Patuli	2011	n/a	101, 110	Baishnabghata Patuli Township, Baghajatin, Garia
Garfa	2011	n/a	104, 105, 106	Garfa, Haltu
Bansdroni	2011	n/a	111, 112, 113,	Bansdroni, Garia, Brahmapur, Kamdahari, Boral
Patuli Women	n/a	n/a	Entire South Suburban Division	

== East Division ==
With its divisional head office at 50/2, East Rajapur, Kolkata-700075, the East Division has the following police stations:

Police station	Established	Area covered km^{2}	KMC wards covered	Neighbourhoods covered
Kolkata Leather Complex	2017	n/a	108	Bantala
Pragati Maidan	2011	n/a	108	Dhapa
Anandapur	2014	n/a	108	Anandapur
Survey Park	2011	n/a	103, 104, 109	Survey Park, Santoshpur, Kalikapur
Purba Jadabpur	n/a	n/a	109	Mukundapur
Panchasayar	2014	n/a	109	Panchasayar, Nayabad

== South West Division ==
With its divisional head office at Tollygunge EF Lines, 555/557, D P S Road, Kolkata-700033, the South West Division has the following police stations:

Police station	Established	Area covered km^{2}	KMC wards covered	Neighbourhoods covered
Taratala	n/a	n/a	79, 80	Taratala, Majherhat
Haridevpur	2011	n/a	115, 122,	Haridevpur, Behala, Pachim Putiary, Karunamoyee, Kudghat
Behala	n/a	n/a	116, 117, 118, 119, 120, 121, 130	Behala, Tollygunge Circular Road, Sirity
Thakurpukur	n/a	n/a	123, 124, 125, 126	Thakurpukur, Barisha, Sarsuna
Sarsuna	2014	n/a	127	Sarsuna, Sarsuna Satellite Township, Shakuntala Park, Oxytown
Parnashree	2011	n/a	128, 129, 131, 132	Parnasree Pally, Behala
Behala Women	n/a	n/a	Entire South West Division	

== Port Division ==
With its divisional head office at 1, Dumayune Avenue, Kolkata-700043, the South Division has the following police stations:

Police station	Established	Area covered km^{2}	KMC wards covered	Neighbourhoods covered
North Port	n/a	n/a	21	Jorabagan
Watgunge	1888 or earlier	n/a	74, 75, 76, 77	Watgunge, Alipore, Kidderpore
South Port	n/a	n/a	75, 79, 80	Kidderpore, Watgunge
Ekbalpur	1888 or earlier	n/a	77, 78, 79	Ekbalpur, Mominpur, Kidderpore
Garden Reach	n/a	n/a	80, 133, 134, 135	Garden Reach, Kidderpore
West Port	n/a	n/a	80, 134	Garden Reach, Kidderpore
Metiaburuz	n/a	n/a	133, 135, 136, 137, 138, 139, 140	Garden Reach
Rajabagan	2011	n/a	139, 141	Rajabagan
Nadial	n/a	n/a	141	Badartala
Watgunge Women	n/a	n/a	Entire Port Division	

== Bhangar Division ==
In July 2023 CM Mamata Banerjee ordered Police Commissioner of Kolkata to include Bhangar under his jurisdiction and also suggested making the area a separate division of Kolkata Police. From 7 January 2024 Kolkata Police started to operate Bhangar as 10th Division.

Police station	Established	Area covered km^{2}	KMC wards covered	Gram Panchayats covered
Bhangar	n/a	n/a	No KMC jurisdiction	Bhangar
Kolkata Leather Complex	n/a	n/a	No KMC jurisdiction	Kolkata Leather Complex
Uttar Kasipur	n/a	n/a	No KMC jurisdiction	Uttar Kasipur
Hatishala	n/a	n/a	No KMC jurisdiction	Hatishala
Polerhat	n/a	n/a	No KMC jurisdiction	Polerhat
Bijoyganj	n/a	n/a	No KMC jurisdiction	Bijoyganj
Narayanpur	n/a	n/a	No KMC jurisdiction	Narayanpur
Bodra	n/a	n/a	No KMC jurisdiction	Bodra
Chandaneswar	n/a	n/a	No KMC jurisdiction	Chandaneswar
