= Shatarup Ghosh =

Indian communist politician (born 1986)

Member of the State Committee, Communist Party of India (Marxist)
- Active in politics
- Assumed office 2022

Personal details
- Born: 22 April 1986 (age 40) Kolkata, West Bengal, India
- Party: Communist Party of India (Marxist)
- Education: Ashutosh College; Rabindra Bharati University
- Occupation: Politician

YouTube information
- Channel: Shatarup Ghosh
- Genres: Political debate; political interview
- Subscribers: 450 thousand
- Views: 185 million
- Last updated: April 2026

Shatarup Ghosh is an Indian politician from West Bengal belonging to the Communist Party of India (Marxist) (CPIM). He is one of the most prominent youth leaders in West Bengal politics at present. He formerly served as the All India Joint Secretary of the Students' Federation of India (SFI), the student wing of the party, and was a member of its central secretariat. He then became a member of the state committee secretariat of the Democratic Youth Federation of India (DYFI), the youth wing of the party. He was inducted into the West Bengal State Committee of the Communist Party of India (Marxist) at the 23rd state party conference in March 2022 and remains a member.

== Early life ==
Shatarup Ghosh was born in Kasba to Shibnath Ghosh and Shila Ghosh. His family was predominantly leftist, though it did not have any political background. He was encouraged to join politics from a very young age. After completing his school education at South Point High School, he joined Asutosh College in 2005 to pursue a BSc in Economics. He completed his MA from Rabindra Bharati University. He is inspired by Karl Marx, Sukanta Bhattacharya, Manik Bandyopadhyay and Maxim Gorky.

== Political career ==
=== Student politics ===
Shatarup Ghosh started his political career while he was a student at Asutosh College. He joined the SFI unit of the college in 2005 and soon became actively involved, later serving as its unit secretary. During his tenure as secretary, SFI won 19 out of 20 seats in the Asutosh College union election and defeated its rival, the Trinamool Congress Chhatra Parishad, an "event that’s out of step with" the trends in West Bengal at the time. One of the major issues during his tenure was the incident involving SFI supporter Souvik Hazra, who lost one eye during a clash between supporters of SFI and TMCP. The party's youth wing made it a key issue, and Ghosh extensively campaigned in the subsequent student union elections. He became the Kolkata district joint secretary in 2010–2011. In 2012, he became the All India Joint Secretary of SFI at the 14th All India Conference held in Madurai, Tamil Nadu.

=== Youth activism and politics ===
In 2013, he protested against the Death of Sudipto Gupta. Sudipto Gupta was an SFI activist who died after being beaten by the West Bengal Police and suffered severe injuries. Shatarup Ghosh was at the forefront of the protests.

After joining the Democratic Youth Federation of India, he rose to prominence and was inducted into the state secretariat of DYFI. He protested against demonetisation, NRC-CAA, rising fuel prices, and unemployment. He participated in multiple strikes, bandhs, and rallies. He has been one of the prominent youth leaders during election campaigns. His leadership and public speaking skills contributed to his rise within CPI(M) as a youth leader. In 2017, he was attacked in Kasba along with other party workers by TMC supporters. In 2019, he was arrested along with 35 CPI(M) workers during a strike. He also had an active role in 2021 Nabanna Abhijan.

He took part in a panel discussion at the India Today Conclave East 2018 alongside BJP's Sambit Patra and Mukul Roy, TMC's Chandan Mitra, and INC's Adhir Ranjan Chowdhury. He is frequently seen in news debates and political discussions.

=== Lifetime Achievement ===
Shatarup Ghosh contested his first MLA election as a CPI(M) candidate at the age of 25 from Kasba in the 2011 West Bengal Legislative Assembly election. He was the youngest candidate from the Left Front at that time. He was fielded again in the 2016 and 2021 elections from the same constituency. However, he lost all of those elections.

== Electoral Performance ==
Year	House	Constituency	Party	Votes	%	Opponent	Opponent Party	Opponent Votes	%	Margin	in %	Result

== See also ==
- Students' Federation of India
- Democratic Youth Federation of India
- Communist Party of India (Marxist)
