= Anandapur, Kolkata =

Anandapur
- Neighbourhood
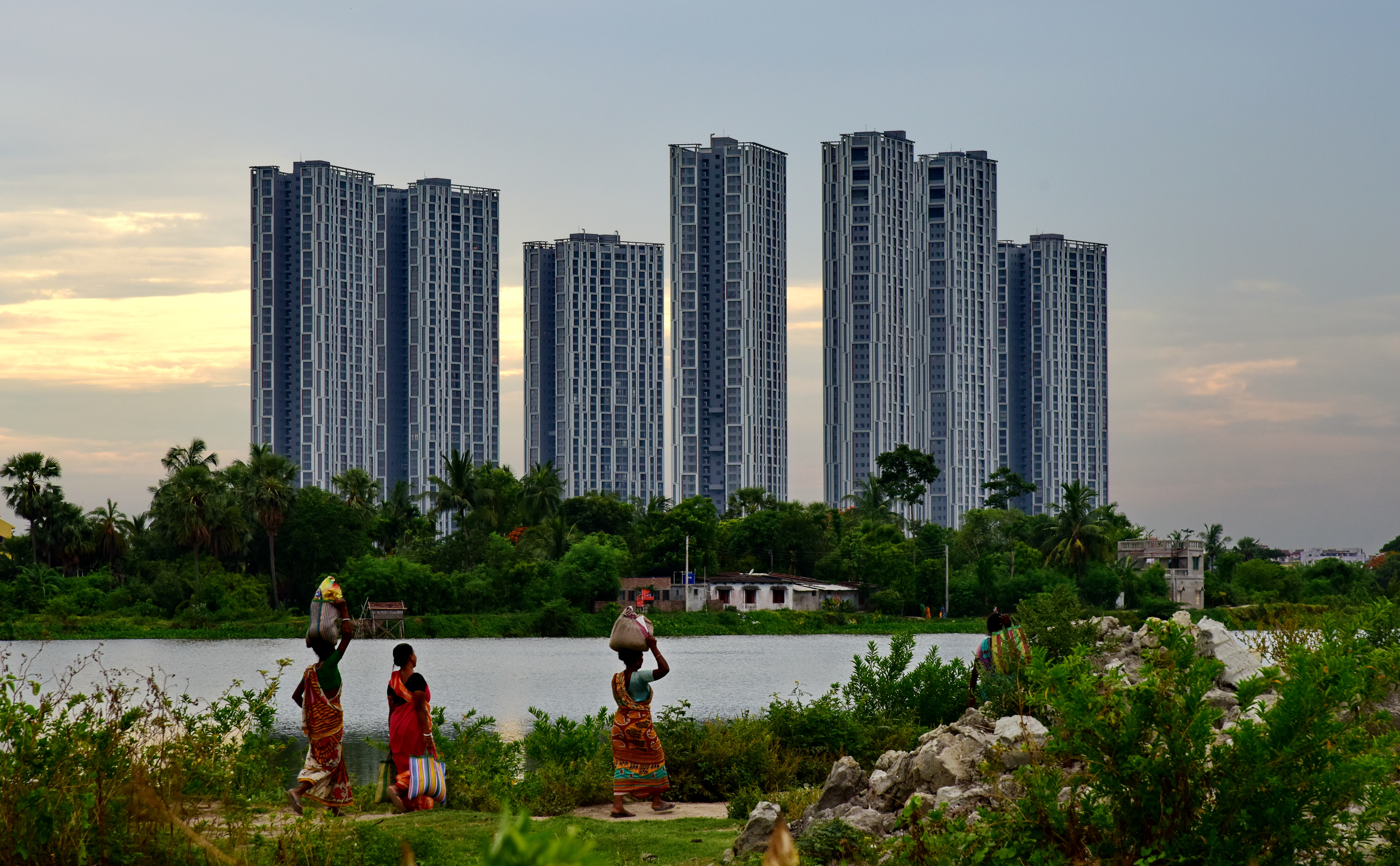
- Urbana, Anandapur

- Location in Kolkata
- Coordinates: 22.514121°N 88.408516°E
- Country: India
- State: West Bengal
- City: Kolkata
- District: Kolkata
- Metro Station: Hemanta Mukhopadhyay
- Municipal Corporation: Kolkata Municipal Corporation
- KMC ward: 108

Population
  - Total: For population see linked KMC ward page
- Time zone: UTC+5:30 (IST)
- PIN: 700107
- Area code: +91 33
- Lok Sabha constituency: Kolkata Dakshin
- Vidhan Sabha constituency: Kasba

Anandapur is a locality of East Kolkata in West Bengal, India. It is located at the south-eastern fringe of the city and marks the limit of KMC area.

== Geography ==
=== Police district ===
Anandapur police station is part of the East division of Kolkata Police. It is located at 757 Madurdaha, Hossainpur, Kolkata-700 107.

== Economy ==
Urbana, is a residential project consisting of 7 towers housing around 1,170 residential apartments. The second tallest towers in Kolkata are located 700 m from the Ruby crossing on E.M. Bypass.

== Education ==
- Calcutta International School, an English-medium co-educational international school with International Baccalaureate affiliation, serves both the local and expatriate communities. Founded in 1953 at Lee Road, Kolkata, it shifted to Anandapur in 2006.
- The Heritage School was established in 2001 by the Kalyan Bharati Trust. The school is affiliated to CISE, IB Diploma Programme and IGCSE
- Heritage Institute of Technology, was established in 2001 by the Kalyan Bharati Trust. It is a private engineering college, affiliated with the Maulana Abul Kalam Azad University of Technology. It offers B.Tech., M.Tech. and M.C.A. courses.
- Meghnad Saha Institute of Technology, was established on 5 September 2001. It is a private engineering college. The college is approved by the AICTE and the Directorate of Technical Education, and affiliated with Maulana Abul Kalam Azad University of Technology.

== Healthcare ==
- Fortis Hospital is a 400-bed super speciality hospital.

== Transport ==
Anandapur Main Road connects the locality with Eastern Metropolitan Bypass and Anandapur High Road. Anandapur High Road connects the locality with Kalikapur, Adarsh Nagar and Bantala (Choubaga).

Private Bus routes starting from Anandapur are connected with several neighbourhoods - 3C/1 and 3C/2 (with Nagerbazar), 18C (with Sarsuna) and KB15 (with Santragachi railway station). Mini Bus routes S107 and S107/1 ply between Anandapur and Howrah Station. A Private Bus also runs through Anandapur (18B/1 - Nonadanga China Mandir to Dakghar).

Ballygunge Junction railway station on Sealdah South lines is the nearest railway station.

== See also ==
- List of tallest buildings in Kolkata
