= East Kolkata =

Coordinates: 22°34′22″N 88°21′50″E

- Neighborhood in Kolkata (Calcutta)
- Interactive map of East Kolkata
- Country: India
- State: West Bengal
- Region: Kolkata Metropolitan Area
- District: North 24 Parganas, Kolkata and South 24 Parganas
- Time zone: UTC+5:30 (IST)
- Area code: +91 33

East Kolkata refers to the eastern areas of the city of Kolkata, India. It includes the localities of Metropolitan Township, Beliaghata, Dhapa, Tangra, Bantala, Topsia, Tiljala, VIP Nagar, Anandapur, Kalikapur, Mukundapur, Ajoy Nagar, Panchasayar and certain parts of Garia like Baishnabghata-Patuli Township, Chak Garia, Nayabad and New Garia. The northern part of East Kolkata is dominated by the townships of Salt Lake and New Town. The region is characterized by well planned (regular) residential blocks and houses many of the attractions of the city.

== Transport ==
The main road transport artery is the Eastern Metropolitan Bypass which runs from Ultadanga in the north to Baruipur Puratan Bazar in the south. Besides VIP Road, Salt Lake Bypass and Major Arterial Road are also important. Kolkata Metro Orange Line (which is under construction now) runs through East Kolkata.

== Townships ==
East Kolkata has five major townships which constitute the bulk of the region. These are as follows :

- Salt Lake
- New Town
- Metropolitan Township (near Chingrighata)
- East Calcutta Township (at Anandapur and eastern part of Kasba)
- Baishnabghata Patuli Township

== IT Hub-Sector V ==
The Information Technology hub is the centre of some of the notable IT/ITES Indian and multinational companies. A total of 1,500 companies (by April 2019) have their office space in Sector V. More than 2 lakh people are employed in Sector V, Salt Lake City by 2018. The area is administered by Naba Diganta Industrial Township Authority (NDITA). Sector V has a total road length of 17 km. Lack of adequate public transport is a major problem of this area. The commissioning of Kolkata Metro's Green and Orange Lines situation is expected to improve the situation. The State Government has also planned a flyover at the College More Crossing for smooth traffic movement.

== Places of interest ==
Major places of interest in East Kolkata include

- City Center in Salt Lake (Sector I)
- Salt Lake Stadium in Salt Lake (Sector III)
- Nicco Park in Salt Lake (Sector IV)
- City Center II in New Town (Action Area II)
- Eco Park in New Town (Action Area II)
- Aquatica at Kochpukur close to New Town (Action Area I)
- Biswa Bangla Gate at Narkelbagan in New Town (Action Area I)
- Kolkata Snow Park at Axis Mall in New Town (Action Area I)
- Nazrul Tirtha in New Town (Action Area I)
- Rabindra Tirtha in New Town (Action Area I)
- Mother's Wax Museum in New Town (Action Area II)
- Fanattic Sports Museum at Ecospace in New Town (Action Area II)
- Sri Ram Mandir in New Town (Action Area II)
- Sai Baba Mandir (Temple) in Mukundpur
- Vedic Village in Rajarhat
- Mani Square Mall close to Kankurgachi
- Swabhumi-The Heritage Plaza at Kadapara close to Phoolbagan
- Science City
- East Kolkata Wetlands
- Metro Cash and Carry at Singhbari close to Mukundapur
- Metropolis Mall at Hiland Park
