= Bantala =

- Neighbourhood
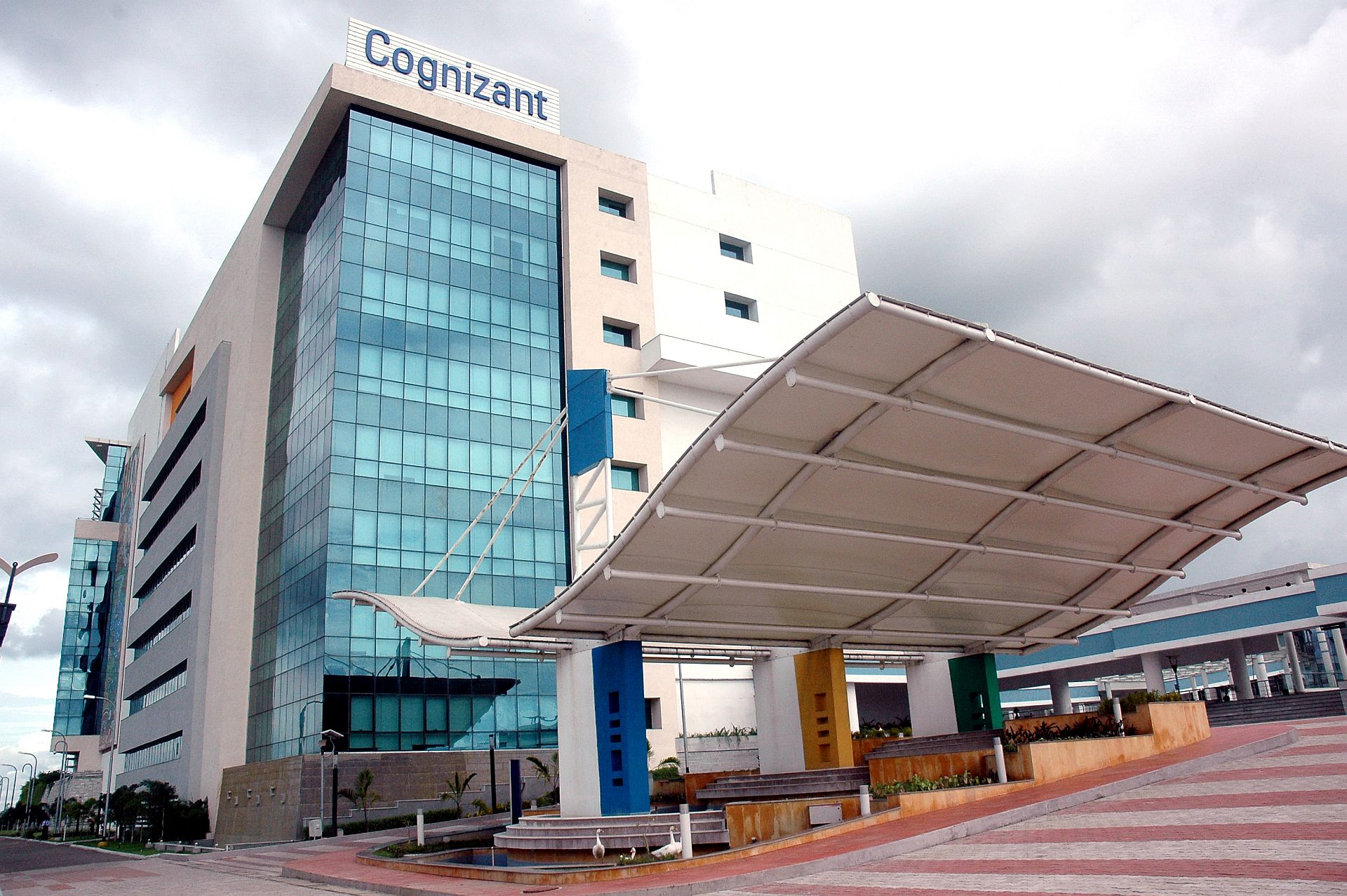
- Cognizant's delivery centre, Bantala

- Location in Kolkata
- Coordinates: 22.507343°N 88.459054°E
- Country: India
- State: West Bengal
- City: Kolkata
- District: Kolkata and South 24 Parganas
- Metro Station: Ritwik Ghatak (under construction)
- Municipal Corporation: Kolkata Municipal Corporation
- KMC ward: 108
- Elevation: 36 ft (11 m)

Population
  - Total: For population see linked KMC ward page
- Time zone: UTC+5:30 (IST)
- PIN: 700150, 743502
- Area code: +91 33
- Lok Sabha constituency: Kolkata Dakshin and Jadavpur
- Vidhan Sabha constituency: Kasba and Bhangar

Bantala is an industrial area of East Kolkata in West Bengal, India. It is located on the eastern fringes of Kolkata.

== Geography ==
Cities and towns in the northern part of Baruipur subdivision (including Sonarpur, Bhangar I & II CD blocks) in South 24 Parganas district
M: municipal city/ town, CT: census town, R: rural/ urban centre, N: neighbourhood
Owing to space constraints in the small map, the actual locations in a larger map may vary slightly

=== Area overview ===
Baruipur subdivision is a rural subdivision with moderate levels of urbanization. 31.05% of the population lives in the urban areas and 68.95% lives in the rural areas. In the northern portion of the subdivision (shown in the map alongside) there are 10 census towns. The entire district is situated in the Ganges Delta and the northern part of the subdivision is a flat plain bordering the metropolis of Kolkata.

Note: The map alongside presents some of the notable locations in the subdivision. All places marked in the map are linked in the larger full screen map.

=== Location ===
Bantala is located at 22.507343°N 88.459054°E.

== Civic administration ==
=== Police station ===
Kolkata Leather Complex police station is part of the East division of Kolkata Police. It is Located at Karaidanga, PO Bhojerhat-743502. Kolkata Leather Complex police station was created in 2017, under South Industrial police district in South 24 Parganas district and transferred to Kolkata Police in the same year. Kolkata Leather Complex police station has jurisdiction over Bhangar I and Bhangar II CD blocks.

== History ==
=== 1990 Rape & Murder Case ===
Bantala is infamous for the 1990 Bantala rape case, an incident of rape and murder of three female health officers, by a group of CPI (M) party members. One of the officers and their driver died while resisting the attackers. Jyoti Basu's CPI-M was in power at the time in West Bengal, however he trivialised the incident as it was politically motivated.

== Economy ==
=== Kolkata Leather Complex ===
Kolkata Leather Complex is an area that houses Kolkata's leather industry. It is spread over an area of 450 hectares (4.5 km^{2}). It has the capacity of developing 1,000 tonnes of hides per day. It is the second most important tanning centre in the country, accounting for about 22-25% of the tanning in the country. Kolkata Leather Complex was set up following a Supreme Court directive to the city's tanneries, on 19 December 1996, to shift to Bantala. It was formally inaugurated on 30 July 2005.

=== Information Technology ===
Bantala IT SEZ is spread over 130 acres. CTS operates from a 20-acre campus.

== Transport ==
Basanti Highway (part of State Highway 3) is the artery of the area. The road is connected with EM Bypass at Dhapa.

=== Bus ===
==== Private Bus ====
- 213 Ghatakpukur - Babughat
- 213A Ghatakpukur - Rajabazar
- 213/1 Ghatakpukur - Shibpur Botanic Garden
- DN16/1 Dhamakhali - Barasat
- SD24 Sonakhali, Basanti - Alipore Zoo

==== CTC Bus ====
- C2A Ghatakpukur - Tollygunge
- T12 Chaital Ghat - Howrah Station

==== Bus Route Without Number ====
- Malancha - Kolkata Station

=== Train ===
Park Circus railway station on Sealdah South lines is the nearest railway station.
