= Kasba, Kolkata =

Kasba
- Neighbourhood in Kolkata (Calcutta)
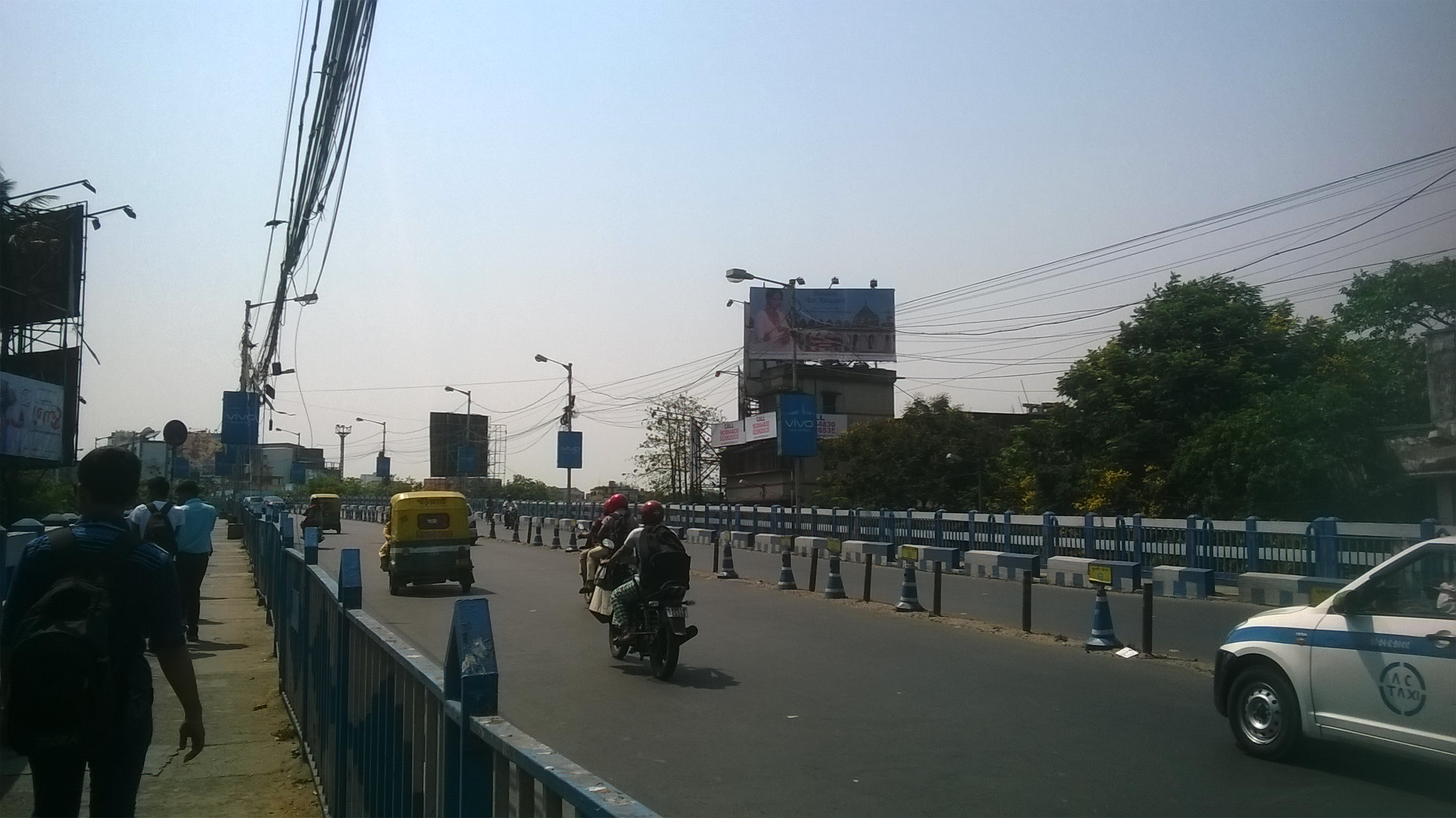
- Bijon Setu, the connector between Kasba and Ballygunge (Gariahat)

- Location in Kolkata
- Coordinates: 22.5176°N 88.3840°E
- Country: India
- State: West Bengal
- City: Kolkata
- District: Kolkata
- Kolkata Suburban Railway: Ballygunge Junction
- Metro Station: VIP Bazar; Hemanta Mukherjee
- Municipal Corporation: Kolkata Municipal Corporation
- KMC wards: 67, 91, 107
- Elevation: 20 ft (6.1 m)
- Time zone: UTC+5:30 (IST)
- PIN: 700039, 700042, 700078, 700107
- Area code: +91 33
- Lok Sabha constituency: Kolkata Dakshin
- Vidhan Sabha constituency: Kasba

Kasba is an upscale and standard locality of South Kolkata, in Kolkata district, West Bengal, India. It is situated in the southern part of the city encircled by the Sealdah South section of the Eastern Railways to the west, Dhakuria and Haltu to the south, the Eastern Metropolitan Bypass to the east and the locality of Tiljala to the north.

== History ==
'Kasba' means hamlet in Bengali and that was what it was - a hamlet for the people working in the nearby leather and allied factories of Tiljala and Tangra and also for the people working in various capacities for the residents of their highly prosperous neighbouring locality of Ballygunge just across the railway track to the west. (Incidentally, the word 'kasba', which means the same in Hindi and Bengali, also means the same as the Arabic 'casbah'.)

The locality is served by the Ballygunge Junction railway station on Sealdah South lines, giving a boost to its accessibility. The first breakthrough for the locality came with the construction of the Bijon Setu in 1978, a rail overbridge above the railway tracks right next to the Ballygunge Junction railway station. This has brought Kasba closer to the Kolkata mainstream and also resulted in quite a number of people finding the locality habitable.

But the rowdy image of the locality persisted when, in 1982, some communists murdered 17 members of the Ananda Marg sect on this bridge.

A recent development for Kasba was the linking of the Rash Behari Avenue to the Eastern Metropolitan Bypass via Rash Behari Connector. This link made Kasba an integral part of the growth direction that the city was taking - towards the east (via Bosepukur and Rajdanga). Rash Behari Connector is also connected to Haltu via Banku Bihari Chatterjee Road (Kasba Road) through Kasba Rathtala. Many buses ply along both the roads. Thus Kasba became more than just a passing area and stopover for a whole section of people taking the EM Bypass from Ballygunge and the whole South Kolkata. Cheap availability of land, proximity to the major business areas of the prosperous southern part of the city and excellent commuting facilities combined taking this once volatile area to being one of the most economically viable and visible parts of the city.

The first developments took place around the junction of the Rash Behari Connector and the EM Bypass - the Kasba Golpark area. Ruby Hospital, the office of Siemens and a host of government-sponsored housing complexes came up in the area. Then the Meghalaya House shifted lock, stock and barrel to this growth region from their old premises at Russel Street, huge amounts of money began pouring into real-estate activities and this resulted in feverish construction activity all along the stretch of the Rash Behari Connector.

Apart from all these, Kasba has also become renowned for two of the Durga Pujas organised nowadays. The Kasba Bosepukur Shitala Mandir and Rajdanga Naba Uday Sangha, which draws thousands of people from across the city and state. Also, Dharmatala United Club's Kali Puja is a very big budget Puja in Kasba.

== Geography ==
=== Police district ===
Kasba police station is in the South Suburban division of Kolkata Police. It is located at 27-A, Bosepukur Road, Kolkata-700042.

Patuli Women police station has jurisdiction over all police districts under the jurisdiction of South Suburban Division i.e. Netaji Nagar, Jadavpur, Kasba, Regent Park, Bansdroni, Garfa and Patuli.

Jadavpur, Thakurpukur, Behala, Purba Jadavpur, Tiljala, Regent Park, Metiabruz, Nadial and Kasba police stations were transferred from South 24 Parganas to Kolkata in 2011. Except Metiabruz, all the police stations were split into two. The new police stations are Parnasree, Haridevpur, Garfa, Patuli, Survey Park, Pragati Maidan, Bansdroni and Rajabagan.

== Transport ==
WBTC Bus

- AC-24 (Patuli - Howrah Stn)
- AC-24A (Kamalgazi - Howrah Stn)
- AC-47 (Kudghat - Shapoorji)
- AC-4B (Joka - Newtown)
- AC-49 (Parnasree - Ecospace)
- C-8 (Joka - Barasat)
- EB-3 (Tollygunge Tram Depot - Ecospace)
- M-14 (Behala 14 no. Bus stand - New Town)
- S-3W (Joka - Ecospace)
- S-4 (Parnasree - Karunamoyee)
- S-22 (Shakuntala Park - Karunamoyee)
- S-46 (Rabindra Nagar - Karunamoyee)
- V-1 (Tollygunge Tram Depot - Airport)
- S-62 (Ramnagar - Patuli)

== Educational institutions ==
- Dolna Day School
- Delhi Public School, Ruby Park
- Academy for Musical Excellence, AMEC Music School Kolkata
- Silver Point School
- The Heritage School, Kolkata
- Naba Ballygunge Mahavidyalaya
- Birla Institute of Technology
- Meghnad Saha Institute of Technology
- Chittaranjan High School (Boys & Girls separate schools)
- Kasba Balika Vidyalaya
- Vivekananda Vidyaniketan
- KidZee School
- Lakshya Educational and Social Activities
- D. Little Names
- Joydeep Karmakar Shooting Academy
- Jagadish Bidyapith for girls and boys separate school
- Modern high school
- South Calcutta Law college

== Important establishments ==
- Ruby General Hospital, Kasba Golpark
- Desun Hospital
- Siemens, Rash Behari Connector
- Meghalaya House, Rash Behari Connector beside Siemens office
- Academy for Musical Excellence, AMEC Music School Kolkata
- Unitech chambers and mall
- Genesis Hospital
- Kasba New Market or South end conclave
- Purba Abasan
- Acropolis building (near DPS or Garden High School) with Acropolis mall and Cinepolis movie plex
- Himalaya opticals
- Sumit Dey
- Khadims (shoe shop)
- Arambag near Narkel bagan
- Bosepukur shitala mandir
- GKB Opticals
- RENE store
- Druhin Basu

== Restaurants and eateries ==
- Blue's Eatery
- Ming's Restaurant
- H2O Restaurant
- Punjabee Rasoi (Near Acropolis Mall)
- Aamaze Hotel and Dhaba
- Machli Baba Fried
