= Ward No. 114, Kolkata Municipal Corporation =

Kolkata Municipal Corporation

Ward No. 114 ওয়ার্ড নম্বর ১১৪
- Kolkata Municipal Corporation
- Nickname: Purba Putiary
- Interactive Map Outlining Ward No. 114
- Location in Kolkata
- Coordinates (dms): 22.476833°N 88.348806°E
- Country: India
- State: West Bengal
- City: Kolkata
- Area Covered: Purba Putiary
- District: South 24 Parganas
- Parliamentary constituency: Jadavpur
- Assembly constituency: Tollyganj
- Reservation: Open
- Metro Station: Netaji
- Borough: 11

Government
  - Councillor: Biswajit Mandal
  - Member of Legislative Assembly: Aroop Biswas
  - Member of Parliamentary constituency: Saayoni Ghosh

Area
  - Total: 1.05 sq mi (2.73 km^{2})

Population (2011)
  - Total: 41,913
- Time zone: UTC+5:30 (IST)
- PIN CODE: 700093
- Area code: +91 033

Ward No. 114, Kolkata Municipal Corporation {ওয়ার্ড নম্বর ১১৪, কলকাতা পৌরসংস্থা} is an administrative division of Kolkata Municipal Corporation in Borough No. 11, surrounding all around this region are Bansdroni, Paschim Putiary, Kudghat, Haridevpur(partly), Rajpur Sonarpur(partly)(Rania 30 feet) Ramkantapur(under Behala Purba (Vidhan Sabha constituency), pincode-7000104)(partly) as nearby all the above. This Region is located in the south of the Tolly's Nullah (Adi Ganga) in the city of Kolkata in the state of West Bengal of the country of India .This area is covered to Purba Putiary area.

== Purba Putiary ==
Purba Putiary {Bengali: পূর্ব পুটিয়ারী} is the area under the ward no. 114 of the Kolkata Municipal Corporation. Before the year of 2000 or around the Year 2000 there is no such a construction building and here is some small house of concrete or Mud and majority area is covered with green trees and greenery and road is not all of peach, some road is cement and majority brick and mud. Now in 2022 here is majorly developed flat and buildings which is all of concrete and majorly all of roads are peach and concrete.

The area is covered with some sub area that is Gangapuri, Mondal Para, New Tollygunge, Brick field area, Shyama Prasad Pally, Bisnu Pally, Sree Pally, Aurobindo Pally, Saha Para, Thakur para Chakdah, Chakdah Government Colony, Padapukur Colony, Payara Bagan, Loknath Pally, Dhali Para, Talbagan, Tatul Tala, Babu Para, Madhya Para, Dakshin Para, Natura Pally, Mission Para, Mission Unchal, Bagan Para, Dinesh Pally, Ananda Pally, Purba Putiary Mazda, Sat Bigha, Vivekananda Pally

== History ==
The establishment and evolution of Kolkata Municipal Corporation followed a long process starting from around the middle of the 19th century. The Municipal Consolidation Act of 1888 and certain steps taken thereafter saw the addition of peripheral areas in the eastern and southern parts of the city to the corporation area. In 1888, there were 75 commissioners, 50 of whom were elected, 15 appointed by the government and 10 nominated from bodies like Chambers of Commerce, Trades Associations and the Port Commissioners. The Calcutta Municipal Act of 1923 brought about important changes. The adjacent municipalities of Cossipore, Chitpore, Manicktola and Garden Reach, as well as the New Dock Extension area, were amalgamated with Kolkata. Garden Reach was later taken out.

Post-independence developments saw the introduction of adult franchise in municipal elections in 1962. The number of wards increased from 75 to 100. Tollygunge was merged with Kolkata in 1953. The Calcutta Municipal Corporation Act 1980, which came into effect in 1984, extended the boundaries of Kolkata by including South Suburban, Garden Reach and Jadavpur municipalities in Kolkata. With the addition of Joka to Kolkata, the number of wards rose to 144.

== Geography ==
Ward No. 114 is bordered on the north by Tolly's Nullah (Adi Ganga); on the east by Bansdroni; on the south by Kabordanga, Ramkantapur udaychal under Behala Purba vidan sabha Constituency and Rania 30 ft, under Rajpur Sonarpur); and on the west by Keorapukur Khal, Haridevpur and Pashim Putiary.

Location of Ward No. 114 in Kolkata Ward Map

== Police District ==
The ward is served by Regent Park Police Station under South Suburban division of Kolkata Police. It is located at 45/D/2A, Moore Avenue, Kolkata-700040.

Patuli Women Police Station is a Womem Police jurisdiction under the jurisdiction of South Suburban Division and also under all Police Stations related to jurisdiction of South Suburban Division, i.e., Netaji Nagar, Jadavpur, Kasba, Regent Park, Bansdroni, Garfa and Patuli.

== Demographics ==
As per the 2011 Census of India, Ward No. 114, Kolkata Municipal Corporation, had a total population of 41,913, of which 21,093 (50%) were males and 20,820 (50%) were females. Population below 6 years was 3,077. The total number of literates in Ward No. 114 was 35,392 (91.13% of the population over 6 years).

Kolkata is the second most literate district in West Bengal. The literacy rate of Kolkata district has increased from 53.0% in 1951 to 86.3% in the 2011 census.

See also – List of West Bengal districts ranked by literacy rate

Literacy in KMC wards

North Kolkata
Ward No. 1 – 86.12%
Ward No. 2 – 94.24%
Ward No. 3 – 86.74%
Ward No. 4 – 89.27%
Ward No. 5 – 90.32%
Ward No. 6 – 81.12%
Ward No. 7 – 87.65%
Ward No. 8 – 93.57%
Ward No. 9 – 91.60%
Ward No. 10 – 92.38%
Ward No. 11 – 87.96%
Ward No. 12 – 84.95%
Ward No. 13 – 83.39%
Ward No. 14 – 87.87%
Ward No. 15 – 88.89%
Ward No. 16 – 88.62%
Ward No. 17 – 92.30%
Ward No. 18 – 78.72%
Ward No. 19 – 89.29%
Ward No. 20 – 85.93%
Ward No. 21 – 78.12%
Ward No. 22 – 85.07%
Ward No. 23 – 71.14%
Ward No. 24 – 73.16%
Ward No. 25 – 85.49%
Ward No. 26 – 82.34%
Ward No. 27 – 88.19%
Ward No. 28 – 79.39%
Ward No. 29 – 70.69%
Ward No. 30 – 88.71%
Ward No. 31 – 88.28%
Ward No. 32 – 75.73%
Ward No. 33 – 91.17%
Central Kolkata
Ward No. 34 – 92.79%
Ward No. 35 – 91.44%
Ward No. 36 – 66.34%
Ward No. 37 – 79.12%
Ward No. 38 – 85.77%
Ward No. 39 – 73.27%
Ward No. 40 – 88.14%
Ward No. 41 – 83.53%
Ward No. 42 – 75.02%
Ward No. 43 – 79.52%
Ward No. 44 – 79.09%
Ward No. 45 – 74.69%
Ward No. 46 – 85.38%
Ward No. 47 – 87.87%
Ward No. 48 – 82.04%
Ward No. 49 – 65.51%
Ward No. 50 – 88.70%
Ward No. 51 – 93.01%
Ward No. 52 – 86.18%
Ward No. 53 – 89.49%
Ward No. 54 – 82.10%
Ward No. 55 – 84.84%
Ward No. 56 – 85.53%
Ward No. 57 – 80.20%
Ward No. 58 – 74.35%
Ward No. 59 – 80.39%
Ward No. 60 – 74.04%
Ward No. 61 – 80.54%
Ward No. 62 – 86.04%
Ward No. 63 – 84.39%
Ward No. 64 – 85.21%
Ward No. 65 – 81.60%
South Kolkata
Ward No. 66 – 80.95%
Ward No. 67 – 89.52%
Ward No. 68 – 90.86%
Ward No. 69 – 86.07%
Ward No. 70 – 94.20%
Ward No. 71 – 92.01%
Ward No. 72 – 90.06%
Ward No. 73 – 89.28%
Ward No. 74 – 84.56%
Ward No. 75 – 80.27%
Ward No. 76 – 88.40%
Ward No. 77 – 83.84%
Ward No. 78 – 83.00%
Ward No. 79 – 81.96%
Ward No. 80 – 71.89%
Ward No. 81 – 85.14%
Ward No. 82 – 84.82%
Ward No. 83 – 85.63%
Ward No. 84 – 85.71%
Ward No. 85 – 88.19%
Ward No. 86 – 89.61%
Ward No. 87 – 90.26%
Ward No. 88 – 85.09%
Ward No. 89 – 92.40%
Ward No. 90 – 84.60%
Ward No. 91 – 90.57%
Ward No. 92 – 93.53%
Ward No. 93 – 91.30%
Ward No. 94 – 89.11%
Ward No. 95 – 95.61%
Ward No. 96 – 96.57%
Ward No. 97 – 94.60%
Ward No. 98 – 96.24%
Ward No. 99 – 95.79%
Ward No. 100 – 95.98%
Ward No. 101 – 95.36%
Ward No. 102 – 93.53%
Ward No. 103 – 94.77%
Ward No. 104 – 96.03%
Ward No. 105 – 93.86%
Ward No. 106 – 92.97%
Ward No. 107 – 90.06%
Ward No. 108 – 80.74%
Ward No. 109 – 85.49%
Ward No. 110 – 91.35%
Ward No. 111 – 93.36%
Ward No. 112 – 92.50%
Ward No. 113 – 92.18%
Ward No. 114 – 91.13%
Ward No. 115 – 95.53%
Ward No. 116 – 86.91%
Ward No. 117 – 86.53%
Ward No. 118 – 90.04%
Ward No. 119 – 94.04%
Ward No. 120 – 92.15%
Ward No. 121 – 91.86%
Ward No. 122 – 92.88%
Ward No. 123 – 93.42%
Ward No. 124 – 92.55%
Ward No. 125 – 92.50%
Ward No. 126 – 93.78%
Ward No. 127 – 91.82%
Ward No. 128 – 92.67%
Ward No. 129 – 92.56%
Ward No. 130 – 95.55%
Ward No. 131 – 93.48%
Ward No. 132 – 90.30%
Ward No. 133 – 83.48%
Ward No. 134 – 73.75%
Ward No. 135 – 75.75%
Ward No. 136 – 85.01%
Ward No. 137 – 79.16%
Ward No. 138 – 78.67%
Ward No. 139 – 77.56%
Ward No. 140 – 79.93%
Ward No. 141 – 75.15%
Note: The regional distribution
is a broad one and
there is some overlapping
2011 Census: Ward-Wise

Primary Census Abstract Data

Census data about mother tongue and religion is not available at the ward level. For district level information see Kolkata district.

According to the District Census Handbook Kolkata 2011, 141 wards of Kolkata Municipal Corporation formed Kolkata district. (3 wards were added later).

== Election highlights ==
The ward forms a city municipal corporation council electoral constituency and is a part of Tollyganj (Vidhan Sabha constituency) and Jadavpur (Lok Sabha constituency) .

Election year	Constituency	Name of councillor	Party affililiation
1981	Ward No. 114	Amal Mitra	Communist Party of India (Marxist)
1985	Ward No. 114	Amal Mitra	Communist Party of India (Marxist)
1990		Amal Mitra	Communist Party of India (Marxist)
1995		Amal Mitra	Communist Party of India (Marxist)
2000		Amal Mitra	Communist Party of India (Marxist)
2005		Amal Mitra	Communist Party of India (Marxist)
2010		Amal Mitra	Communist Party of India (Marxist)
2015		Biswajit Mandal	All India Trinamool Congress
2021		Biswajit Mandal	All India Trinamool Congress
