= 1990 Bantala rape case =

Rape of three health officers

- Date: 03jun 1990
- Time: 6:30 pm IST (UTC+05:30)
- Location: Bantala, South 24 Parganas, West Bengal, India
- Deaths: 2 (1 female victim, 1 male victim)
- Injuries: 2 (female victims)

On 03 Jun 1990, three health officers in India, two from the Health Department of the Government of West Bengal and one from UNICEF, were raped by a group of confirmed CPI (M) party members, in Bantala Road, when they were returning from Rangabelia village in Gosaba. One of the officers and their driver died while resisting the attackers.

== Incident ==
On 03 Jun 1990, a team of three health officers were returning to Kolkata after inspecting an immunization program in Gosaba. The team consisted of Anita Dewan, the Deputy District Extension Media Officer of the West Bengal Health Department; Uma Ghosh, a senior officer of the Health Department; and Renu Ghosh, a representative of UNICEF's World Health Organization office in New Delhi. Around 6:30 pm, when they reached Bantala near the Eastern metropolitan bypass, a group of 4-5 youths stopped their car near the local club. The driver Abani Naia made an attempt to swerve and escape, but he lost control and the car overturned. Another gang of 10-12 youths arrived at the spot, who pulled one of the women out of the car, while the others pulled out the other two women. The driver of the car tried to resist the youths, but failed. The attackers crushed the driver's genitalia and set the car on fire. The lady officers were then taken to a nearby paddy field and raped. One woman, Anita Dewan, was killed as she tried to resist the rapists.

The police brought the naked bodies of the officers to the emergency department of Calcutta National Medical College at around 11:30 pm. Initially they were presumed dead, but later two of them were found to be alive and were admitted for treatment. A doctor who examined the dead woman, Anita Dewan, fainted when she discovered a metallic torch had been inserted inside her vagina.

The injured driver was transferred to SSKM Hospital for treatment. He bore 43 wounds in his body caused by blunt, sharp and heavy weapons. His penis was smashed by the attackers. On 4 June 1990 at 5:40 am, he died.

== Investigation ==
Prasanta Sur, the then Health Minister of West Bengal, defended the mob, which consisted of members of his political party, by contending that the victims might have been mistaken as child-abductors. The chief minister Jyoti Basu also attempted to trivialize the incident. But there is controversy regarding actual cause of the incident. It has been speculated that Dewan was the main target because she had been collecting evidence about funds allocated by the UNICEF for rural development in the state being misused & misappropriated by the local panchayat members affiliated with the ruling CPI(M) for their own enrichment. After investigations by the government, the six accused in the case were sentenced to life-imprisonment.

== In popular culture ==
The Red Files is a Bengali thriller film directed by Kingshuk Dey, based on the 1990 Bantala rape case in West Bengal. The movie aims to shed light on the issue of unsolved cases and the struggle for justice. It features a cast including Kinjal Nanda, Bidipta Chakraborty, and Mumtaz Sorcar, with Nanda and Chakraborty portraying lawyers and Sorcar playing a top cop. Director Kingshuk Dey emphasizes the need for societal awareness and unity in fighting against such crimes. The film, currently in post-production, is set to be released soon, with Dey handling the story, dialogue, and script, Subhadeep Naskar serving as the DOP, and Soumya Rit composing the music
