= Kolkata Light Rail Transit =

Rapid transit system proposed for Kolkata, West Bengal, India

Kolkata Light Rail Transit (KLRT)

Overview
- Owner: Kolkata Mass Rapid Transit Pvt Ltd
- Locale: Kolkata, India
- Transit type: Light Rail
- Number of lines: 2

Operation
- Operator: SREI Infrastructure Finance

Technical
- Track gauge: 1,000 mm (3 ft 3 3/8 in)

Kolkata Light Rail Transit (KLRT) is a mass rapid transit system proposed for the city of Kolkata in India. The Government of West Bengal and SREI Infrastructure Finance signed a memorandum of understanding (MoU) to set up the light rail transit (LRT) system. A special purpose vehicle, Kolkata Mass Rapid Transit Pvt Ltd has been formed to execute this Rs.6000 crore project.

== History ==
April 2002: The Master Plan for Kolkata Metropolitan Area (KMA) for 2025 was submitted for the approval by the Metropolitan Planning Committee. It was proposed to be executed soon after securing agreement from the Chief Minister of West Bengal, Buddhadeb Bhattacharjee. It was suggested in the feasibility report that it will work well as an intermediate system for some selected corridors. The search for funding started and it did not sound much in public.

2004: The Kolkata government wanted assistance from the central government which agreed to provide assistance for one major transit system project. Bhattacharjee chose LRTS over the East-West Metro corridor for the assistance and asked the state transport secretary to prepare a revised feasibility study.

April 2005: The feasibility study by CES termed it as EMRTS (Elevated Mass Rapid Transit System) and proposed three corridors, all terminating at Esplanade. The rolling stock they proposed was high speed trams.

February 2009: The LRTS project was listed under JNNURM. It was to be jointly executed by SREI and the Czech-based AMEX Corporation on a Build-Operate-Transfer (BOT) basis. It was also proposed to make the LRTS station at Barrackpore a terminal point connecting it with the main line station. Mr. Hemant Kanoria, Chairman and Managing Director of Srei Infrastructure Limited signed an MOU with the Government of West Bengal to execute this project along with their consortium partners.

February 2020: The Housing Infrastructure Development Corporation (Hidco) is engaging a consultant to prepare a project proposal for either a ropeway system or a personalized rapid transit or a light rail transit (LRT) system from New Town's Action Area III to the Biswa Bangla Gate on the Narkeldanga intersection of the main arterial road in Action Area I.

== Corridors ==
- Corridor 1: Joka — Esplanade.
- Corridor 2: Esplanade — Barrackpore.
- Corridor 3: New Town (Narkelbagan) — Hatisala.
