= Kolkata Leather Complex =

- Planned Industrial Complex
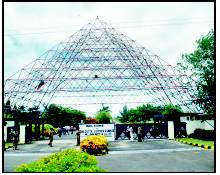
- Calcutta Leather Complex, Gate No-1
- Nickname: Bantala
- Location in West Bengal, India
- Coordinates: 22.499881°N 88.516055°E
- Country: India
- State: West Bengal
- District: South 24 Parganas

Area
  - Total: 4.5 km^{2} (1.7 sq mi)

Population (2011)
  - Total: 238 Tanneries
  - Density: 53/km^{2} (140/sq mi)

Languages
  - Official: Bengali, Hindi
- Time zone: UTC+5:30 (IST)
- PIN: 743 502

The Kolkata Leather Complex is an industrial complex at Karaidanga, Bantala near East Kolkata, India. It is located 20 km from the central business district of Kolkata and has an area of about 4.5 square kilometres. It was conceived following a Supreme Court directive to relocate polluting tanneries and now encompasses approximately 500 individual units, handling 22 to 25 percent of India's tanning output. The complex features dedicated infrastructure including a Common Effluent Treatment Plant, pumping stations, and utilities for consolidated waste management and environmental compliance.

== The complex ==
The complex is intended to serve as a central leather-tanning business for Kolkata. Bantala has approximately 500 tanneries and the Kolkata one performs 22-25% of all the tanning in India. The state of West Bengal is responsible for about 55% of India's leather exports. As of 2009, about 200 tanneries were relocated to the Kolkata Leather Complex. The project includes a police station and a fire station; in 2017 the police station was brought under the jurisdiction of the Kolkata police. The facility also houses the Government College of Engineering and Leather Technology, which is affiliated with Maulana Abul Kalam Azad University of Technology, Kolkata. A 130-acre (53 ha) portion was designated as an IT park.

The complex was conceived in the early 1990s as "an integrated complex housing all activities relating to the leather industry in a modern and environment-friendly manner". The need for the project became evident when the Supreme Court of India ordered that all tanning activities in Kolkata be moved outside the city limits. As of 2013, the complex was still not fully operational, and many illegal tanneries continued to operate outside the complex.

== Effluent Treatment Plant ==
Pumping stations carry the effluent from the tanneries to a Common Effluent Treatment Plant (CETP). Problems in completing the common effluent treatment plant have caused serious difficulties, with toxic waste polluting the construction activities of some companies. It was mandated by the Supreme Court in 1995 to treat 30 million litres per day of tannery waste relocated from Kolkata. Although the project was to be completed by November 1997. It was later expanded with seven additional components, by February 2010 key systems, such as the Common Chrome Recovery System, solid‑waste disposal unit, and treated‑effluent sump and pumping station, still remained unfinished. Central Pollution Control Board tests found chromium levels in the plant's sludge at around 25 mg/kg, far exceeding safe limits, and noted poor overall CETP performance. Inspections revealed that chrome‑laden cutting scraps and solid wastes were being dumped roadside rather than processed, posing serious surface and groundwater contamination risks. The National River Conservation Directorate further criticized both tanneries and the state government for inadequate equipment maintenance, lack of qualified staff, and failure to follow up on recommended environmental safeguards.
