= Hatisala =

- Village
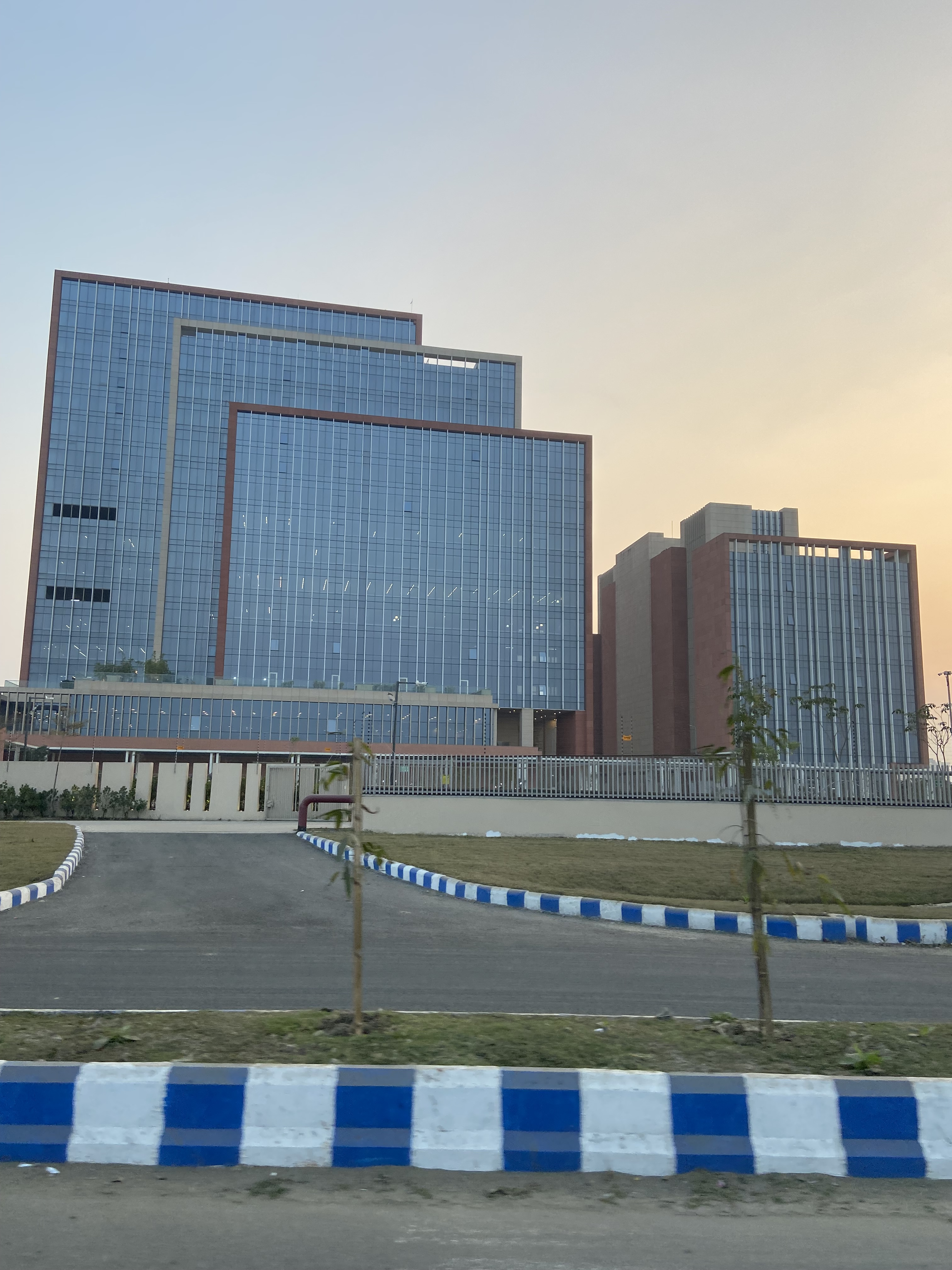
- ITC Green Centre, Hatisala

- Location in West Bengal, India Hatisala (India)
- Coordinates: 22°32′44.69″N 88°31′33.23″E
- Country: India
- State: West Bengal
- District: South 24 Parganas
- CD block: Bhangar II

Population (2011)
  - Total: 3,810

Languages
  - Official: Bengali
  - Additional official: English
- Time zone: UTC+5:30 (IST)
- PIN: 700135
- Telephone code: 03174
- Lok Sabha constituency: Jadavpur
- Vidhan Sabha constituency: Bhangar
- Website: s24pgs.gov.in

Hatisala is a village within the jurisdiction of the Hatishala police station in the Bhangar II CD block in the Baruipur subdivision in South 24 Parganas in the Indian state of West Bengal. It is also part of the New Town's Action Area III.

Hatisala has recently seen some IT growth, with the opening of the Infosys Development Centre and the construction of other IT parks like ITC Infotech and Wipro New Town.

== Geography ==
Cities and towns in the northern part of Baruipur subdivision (including Sonarpur, Bhangar I & II CD blocks) in South 24 Parganas district
  - M: municipal city/town
  - CT: census town
  - R: rural/urban centre
  - N: neighbourhood
Owing to space constraints in the small map, the actual locations in a larger map may vary slightly.

== Demographics ==
According to the 2011 Census of India, Hatisala had a total population of 3,810, of which 1,914 (51%) were males and 1,896 (49%) were females. The total number of literate persons in Hatisala was 2,174 (67.89% of the population over 6 years).

== Transportation ==
=== Light Rail Transit (proposed) ===
A Light Rail Transit corridor from Hatisala to Newtown (Narkelbagan) was proposed in 2017.

=== Bus ===
Government Bus

- EB-13 Howrah railway station - Hatisala
- EB-16 Thakurpukur - Hatisala

Private Bus

- K1 Kolkata Station - Hatisala
- KB-22 Kolkata Station - Jamirgachi
- KB-24 Kolkata Station - Hatisala
