= Fanattic Sports Museum =

- Established: January 2017
- Location: Ecospace Business Park Premises, New Town, Greater Kolkata, West Bengal, India
- Type: Sports Museum
- Website: www.fanatticsportsmuseum.com

Fanattic Sports Museum (FSM) is a sports museum dedicated to various types of sports and is located at Ecospace Business Park in Action Area - II of New Town, Kolkata, India. Established in January 2017, FSM is known as the first sports museum in Kolkata as well as in West Bengal.

It is an initiative by Prof. Boria Majumdar, an eminent historian, writer, commentator and journalist, in association with Harshavardhan Neotia, chairman of the Ambuja Neotia group, and consists of sports-related artefacts of various famous sports personalities.

== General references ==
- http://blogs.economictimes.indiatimes.com/et-commentary/fanattic-sports-museum-a-new-temple-of-sports/
- http://www.oneindia.com/sports/sachin-tendulkar-opens-fanatic-sports-museum-kolkata-2331687.html
- https://sports.ndtv.com/othersports/indias-first-sports-museum-opens-in-kolkata-1653879
- http://www.hindustantimes.com/other-sports/sachin-tendulkar-s-gloves-messi-s-boot-and-more-at-india-s-first-sports-museum/story-azjCRH0qMos8BMesIlHK1I.html
- indiatoday.intoday.in
- http://www.financialexpress.com/sports/kolkatas-fanattic-sports-museum-is-a-treasure-house-of-usain-bolts-jersey-to-sachin-tendulkars-gloves/538031/
- http://www.cricketcountry.com/news/sachin-tendulkar-sourav-ganguly-abhinav-bindra-inaugurate-indias-first-multi-sport-museum-571442
- indiatoday.intoday.in
- indiatoday.intoday.in
- http://cricwizz.com/blog/2017/01/30/fanattic-sports-museum-city-joy-gets-share-sporting-legacy/
