= Sarsuna satellite township =

Township in Kolkata, West Bengal

Coordinates: 22°28′57.48″N 88°16′57.47″E

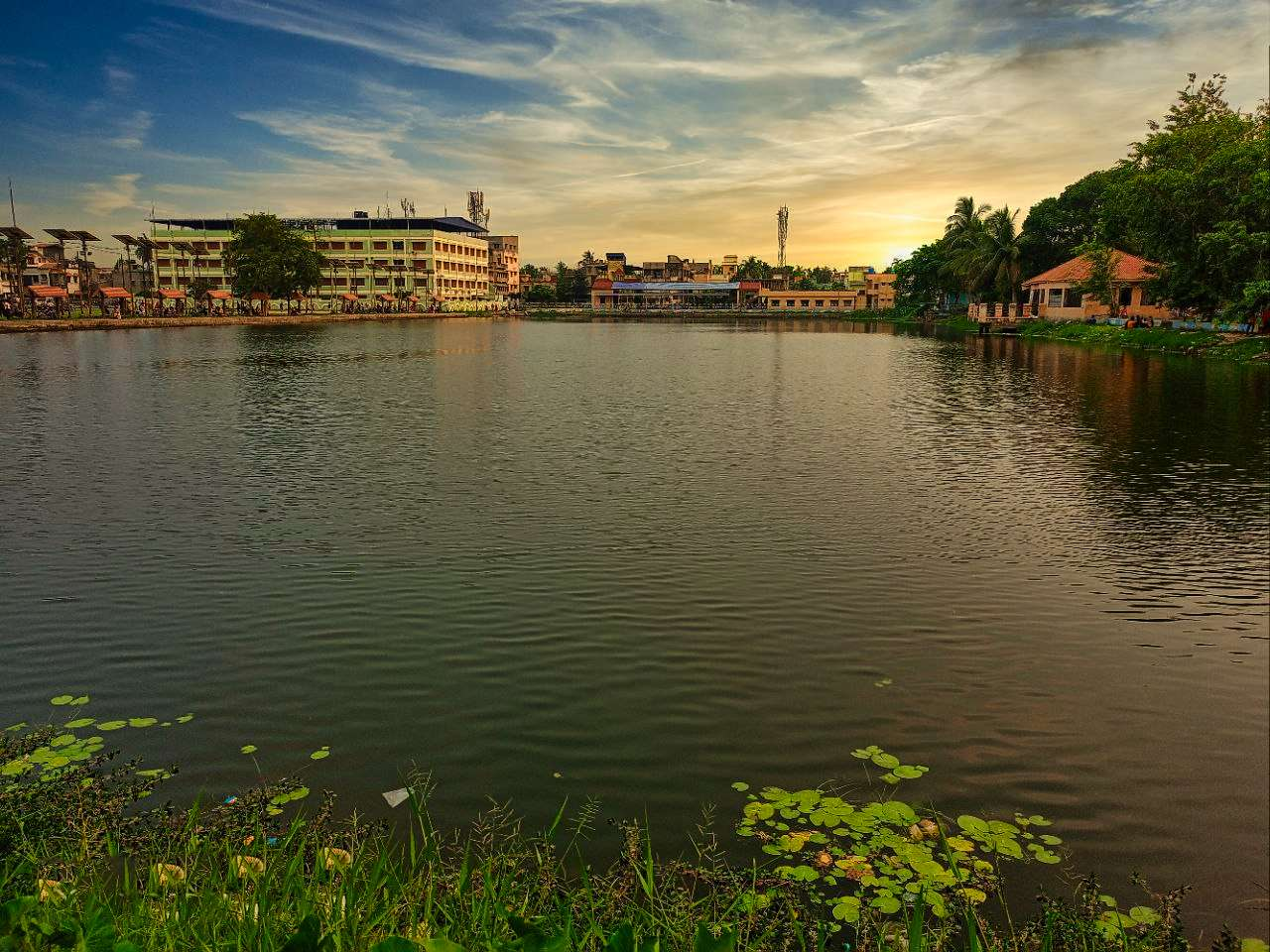
Sarsuna College Lake, located within Sarsuna Satellite Township

Sarsuna Satellite Township (also known as Shakuntala Park Housing Estate) is a mini township located in Southwest Kolkata, and forms part of the greater Behala region in the Indian state of West Bengal.

== Location ==
This Township is 12 kilometers from Raj Bhavan / Esplanade, Kolkata, West Bengal, India (Central Kolkata). The township is under Kolkata Municipal Corporation area with Ward Number 127.

This Township is reachable through Diamond Harbour Road. After Behala market, reach Behala Chowrasta, then take right turn through Ho Chi Minh Sarani (Formally known as Biren Roy Road (WEST). The Road is now well maintained and wide. The Township is about 2.5 km from Behala Chowrasta. Several Buses and Auto services are available from Behala Chowrasta. It starts 2 km from Behala Chowrasta (Second Phase of township) and extends to another one and a half kilometers or more till end of First phase of the Township.

== About ==
It is a predominantly Bengali neighborhood, but many South Indians, Goans, Biharis and Oriyas reside in the area. It is bordered by Shakuntala Park area (Patton Tank Factory) in the east and Kethopole and Oxytown to the west. The main road is Ho-Chi-Minh Sarani, popularly known as Biren Roy Road (West).

The area was rural prior to the construction of this Township by West Bengal Housing Board. Many families are living here since centuries.

West Bengal Housing Board constructed this Township mainly for middle class service people of different groups, like Higher Income group, Middle income group, Lower income group and economically weaker group.

The West Bengal Housing Board developed the township for residential purposes, selling vacant plots (2K and 3K series), pre-constructed houses (H2, H1, M1, L and E schemes) and 4-story apartments. "H" denotes for Higher, "M" for middle, "L" for lower and "E" for economically weaker group people. The township is divided into 2 phases. In 1985, first allotment started through newspaper advertisements.

The area is under the jurisdiction of Sarsuna Police Station, which is a part of the South West Division of the Kolkata Police Department.

Three lakes (Lake No. 1, 2, and 3 respectively) are within half a kilometer of the township. Lake 1 is maintained by Kolkata Municipal Corporation with a park and walking path all around, although the other lakes are not maintained and are used as fishery. During "Chhat Puja" Biharis assemble at the lake to offer puja.

Clubs and associations organize celebrations for Durga Puja, the main Bengali festival, Kali Puja and other pujas. The Shakuntala Park Housing area hosts film and TV serial shots. There are several parks opened by corporation and those are maintained properly.

A playground beside Lake-1 is named Central Park. It is under supervision of Kolkata Municipal Corporation. A swimming pool is situated beside Lake 1 in the central park. On the southern end there are two colleges, Sarsuna College and Sarsuna Law College . A supermarket is located at the southern end of this township. Life Insurance Corporation of India operates their Zonal Training Institute, Jeevan Vidya here. Employees from across India train there, staying at the adjacent L.I.C. Hostel.
