= Death of Sudipto Gupta =

2013 death in police custody in India

Murder of Sudipto Gupta
- Protest after the murder of Sudipto Gupta
- Native name: সুদীপ্ত গুপ্তের হত্যাকাণ্ড
- Location: Kolkata, West Bengal, India
- Date: 2nd April, 2013
- Victim: Sudipto Gupta
- Assailant: Kolkata Police

The murder of Sudipto Gupta refers to the death of a 24-year-old student activist in Kolkata, India, on 2 April 2013, following a confrontation between protesters and police. Gupta, a member of the Students' Federation of India (SFI), was participating in a demonstration protesting the suspension of student union elections by the TMC govt in West Bengal. The incident drew widespread attention and controversy over allegations of police brutality and political repression in Kolkata.

== Background ==
In early 2013, tensions had been rising between student organizations and the state government led by the All India Trinamool Congress (TMC). Student groups, particularly SFI, were mobilizing around issues such as campus democracy, alleged administrative irregularities, and broader political grievances against the state government. Demonstrations and marches had become frequent in Kolkata and other parts of West Bengal.

On 12 February 2013, violence ensued between TMCP, the student arm of the ruling TMC and Chattra Parishad during student union election at Harimohan Ghose College, in Garden Reach. A police officer was killed in the violence. The higher education department of WB govt announced the complete suspension of student union elections in the state to prevent any more incidents, without having discussions with any other student organizations.

On 2 April 2013, SFI activists organized a protest march in central Kolkata demanding reinstatement of student union elections. The demonstration was intended to submit a memorandum to state authorities but was stopped by police near the Esplanade area. A confrontation ensued, leading to the detention of several protesters, including Sudipto Gupta.

Sudipto Gupta (8th November 1988 - 2nd April 2013) was a student of political science at Rabindra Bharati University, and a West Bengal state committee member in the Students' Federation of India (SFI). He was also a former General Secretary of Netaji Nagar College Student Union, where he completed his Bachelors degree on Political Science.

== Incident ==
The detained protesters, including Sudipto Gupta were being transferred to Presidency Correctional Jail by a police bus. According to eyewitnesses and fellow protesters, he was severely beaten by police personnel before and during custody. The police brutality led Sudipto to lose control, falling from the bus and collapsing into a lamp post. However police sources alleged that he fell from the police bus while being transported accidentally and sustained fatal injuries. Gupta was taken to a hospital, where he was declared dead.

When Sudipto hit a lamp-post, one police hit him just above the nose, on his forehead with a baton and he fell down. His eyes bulged out and his eyes and nose were bleeding profusely.

The circumstances of his death quickly became a matter of dispute. While the police maintained that it was an accidental fall, student organizations and opposition parties claimed that it was a case of custodial violence. The presence of injuries on Gupta’s body intensified allegations of excessive use of force.

== Aftermath ==
The death of Sudipto Gupta triggered protests across Kolkata and other parts of West Bengal. Student groups, civil society organizations, and political parties organized demonstrations demanding justice and accountability. The incident became a focal point for criticism of the TMC state government’s handling of dissent.

A judicial inquiry was ordered by the state government to investigate the circumstances surrounding the death. The findings of the inquiry remained contested, with differing interpretations from authorities and opposition groups. The case also raised broader concerns about police conduct, custodial safety, and the rights of protesters.

Police claimed that he was hanging his head out of the window and hit a lamppost, while students maintain, he was beaten by police. The bus driver was arrested and charged with negligent driving.

Post mortem examination found multiple injuries on his body, heart, lung and brain, along with internal bleeding and pulmonary contusion consistent with assault. However, a magisterial inquiry ruled out any role or negligence of the police in the death stating it was caused due to an accident.

SFI had demanded a judicial investigation into this case, but was rejected by the state government.
