= GKB Opticals =

Indian retail chain of optical products

- Industry: Retailing, Eyewear
- Founded: India, 1959
- Headquarters: Kolkata
- Area served: India
- Products: Prescription Lens
- Parent: GKB Group
- Website: Gkboptic.com

GKB Opticals is an Indian retailer of optical products and operates a chain of retail stores in India.

== History ==
The company was founded by Brijendra Kumar Gupta. Headquartered in Kolkata, the company has over 90 stores across India and has employed more than 600 people.

In 1959, the company opened its first retail outlet in Gariahat, Kolkata.

In 2010, Essilor acquired GKB Opticals Limited to form GKB Optic Technologies.
