= Chittaranjan High School =

Location
- Chittaranjan; West Bengal, 713331; India; 23.8488299°N 86.893545°E

Information
- Established: 1967

Chittaranjan High School is located in Chittaranjan, West Bengal, India and it provides education from the primary level up to the Senior Secondary level (i.e. 10+2). The school was established in 1967. It was named after the freedom fighter Chittaranjan Das. Chittaranjan High School is a state run English medium School in West burdwan, West Bengal. It was established in the year 1949.

== Organisation ==
This is an English Medium school run by Chittaranjan Locomotive Works. The school is affiliated to the West Bengal Board of Secondary Education and the West Bengal Council of Higher Secondary Education.

Classes are in two sessions, one in the morning for primary students, and the other in the afternoon for 6th-10+2 students.

== Facilities ==
The building is T-shaped. It is two storey and has an underground building which is connected to the auditorium. The entrance gives way straight towards the auditorium and on both sides are class rooms. There are two playgrounds. The school has a laboratory facility. In front of the school is Kasturba Gandhi hospital.

== Sports ==
No sports

== See also ==
- Education in India
- List of schools in India
- Education in West Bengal
