= Dhapa, India =

Dhapa
- Neighbourhood in Kolkata (Calcutta)
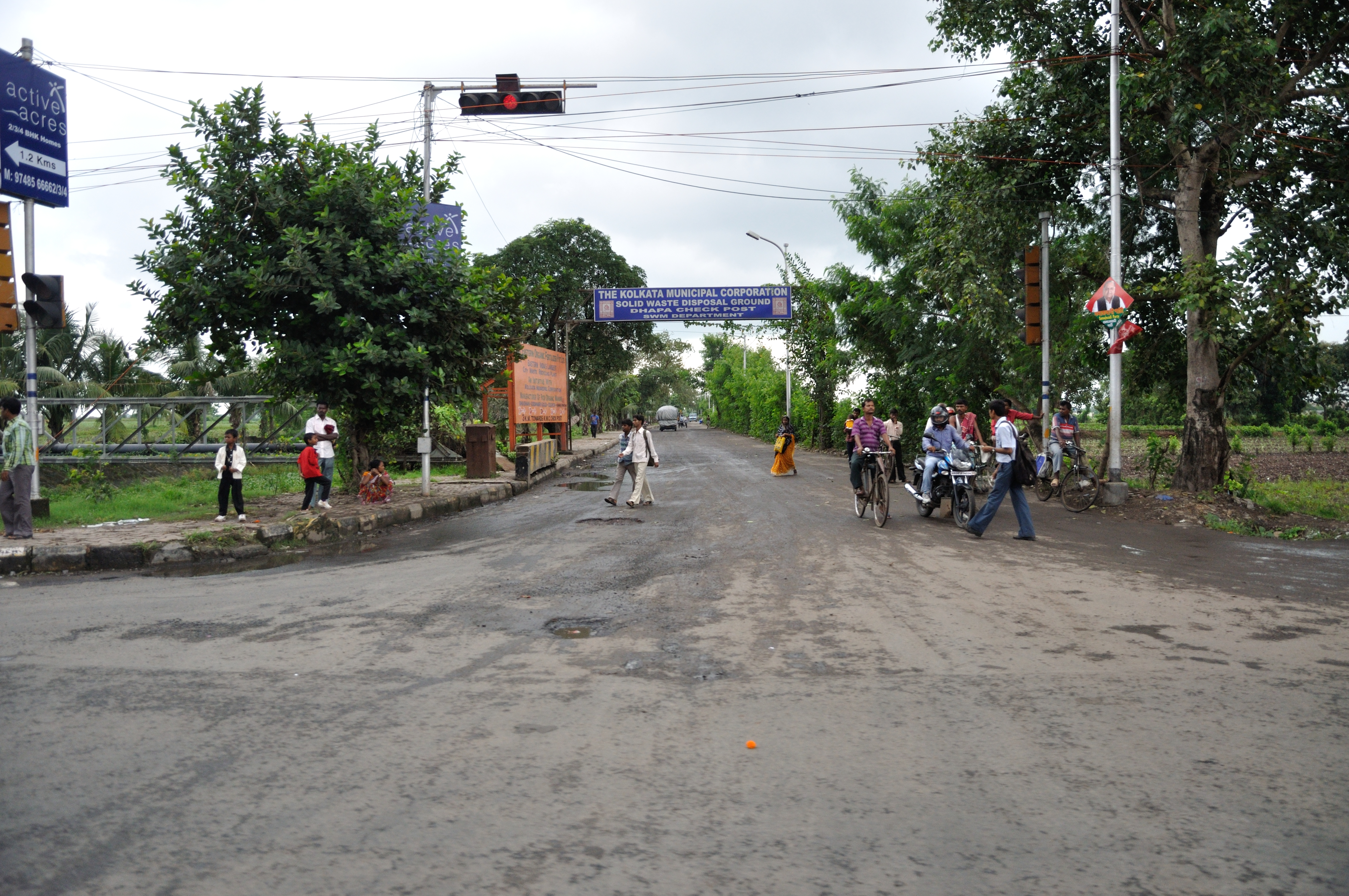
- Dhapa road from EM Bypass

- Location in Kolkata
- Coordinates: 22.561333°N 88.442254°E
- Country: India
- State: West Bengal
- City: Kolkata
- District: Kolkata
- Metro Station: Beleghata and Barun Sengupta
- Municipal Corporation: Kolkata Municipal Corporation
- KMC wards: 57, 58
- Elevation: 36 ft (11 m)

Population
  - Total: For population see linked KMC ward page
- Time zone: UTC+5:30 (IST)
- PIN: 700105
- Area code: +91 33
- Lok Sabha constituency: Kolkata Uttar
- Vidhan Sabha constituency: Entally

Dhapa is a locality on the fringes of East Kolkata, India. The area consists of landfill sites where the solid wastes of the city of Kolkata are dumped. "Garbage farming" is encouraged in the landfill sites. More than 40 per cent of the green vegetables in the Kolkata markets come from these lands. There are four sectors in Dhapa for dumping garbage that are filled with 2,500 tonnes of waste per day.

== Crime and criminal activities ==
The place was once notorious for criminal and anti-social activities as illegal drugs, liquor and other contraband objects were sold openly. There were various mafia groups who fought among themselves while trying to control the illegal liquor trade (hooch, desi). During the decades of 80's and 90's this area was once ruled by notorious criminals like Shiv Narayan, Ganesh, Jhantu and Tarak. However, with the arrival of new Officer in Charge things were under control by the year 2000. In 2013 this area suffered a major blow when the councilor Mr. Sambhunath Kow was charged with non intentional murder of a local mafia named Adhir Maiti.

== Demography ==
Majority of the people living in the place are either migrant casual laborers who work in tanneries of China Town or are employed in small factories nearby. Some of the inhabitants are peasants and farmers who work in the fields that line the EM Bypass. These farmers came from Medinipur, Durgapur, Bihar and Orissa. The majority of the population is poor and some live below the poverty line. Recently new population has migrated in the Hatgachia area. Also the family of Patwas have moved here from Bihar who have minted the money in jewellery business.

== Geography ==
=== Location ===
Dhapa is located near the Parama Island on the Eastern Metropolitan Bypass, on the eastern side of Kolkata. The Eastern Metropolitan Bypass, Beleghata and Tangra are on the west, Basanti Highway and Bantala are on the south and Chingrighata is on the north. The closest landmarks near Dhapa are the ITC Sonar hotel and Silver Spring housing which fall on the west side, Milan Mela ground or the permanent trade fair ground and Science City which are on the south side and Mathpukur five point crossing which is on the west side. In the west side of Dhapa, an old and important landmark exists which is the Awatar Bhavan that has Dhapa Post Office in it. It also has the St. Thomas school. Dhapa is home to more than 40% fresh vegetables around the city. Among all these things dhapa is also home to one of the biggest rice market.

The Kolkata Municipal Corporation is responsible for providing the basic civic facilities and amenities to the residents of the place like Water, Drainage, Sanitation, Garbage Collection, Anti Malarial and Health Care programs. The Calcutta Electricity Supply Corporation (CESC) provides electricity to the area as well as to entire Kolkata as the sole electricity provider.

=== Police district ===
Pragati Maidan police station is part of the East division of Kolkata Police. It is located at Parama Traffic Island, Kolkata-700 107.

Jadavpur, Thakurpukur, Behala, Purba Jadavpur, Tiljala, Regent Park, Metiabruz, Nadial and Kasba police stations were transferred from South 24 Parganas to Kolkata in 2011. Except Metiabruz, all the police stations were split into two. The new police stations are Parnasree, Haridevpur, Garfa, Patuli, Survey Park, Pragati Maidan, Bansdroni and Rajabagan.

== History ==
Dhapa is located in the eastern fringes of Kolkata. The History of Dhapa Starts from Bhabhanath Sen who was a contractor of Kolkata Corporation responsible for Dumping Solid Wastes at Dhapa. In About 1925 this work was taken over by Late Yadunandan Singh who helped many people coming from Bihar to do Agriculture and other working opportunities nearby Dhapa Area. Late Mr Singh had laid the foundation of Jan Kalyan School. He also served as the president of Boichtolla Union Board and was also the Panchayat Pradhan. During his tenure he laid the foundation of Bengal Potteries and Tyre Corporation of India.

== Pollution in Dhapa ==
Dhapa has been a major victim of Air and sound pollution. In 1986 the pond next to the Dhapa Post Office was filled by the city garbage. As a result, at least 65% of the population above the age of 35 are infected by the exposure to tuberculosis.

== Schools ==
The area has several schools like the Harvard House High School (ICSE), St. Thomas School , St. Patrick Day School (Primary), Janakalyan School (West Bengal Secondary Board) and a number of small primary and secondary schools affiliated to the local state board (West Bengal).

== See also ==
- Bhalswa landfill
