= Kasba, West Bengal Assembly constituency =

Constituency of the West Bengal Legislative Assembly, in India

Kasba
- Constituency No. 149 for the West Bengal Legislative Assembly
- Interactive Map Outlining Kasba Assembly Constituency

Constituency details
- Country: India
- Region: East India
- State: West Bengal
- District: South 24 Parganas
- Lok Sabha constituency: Kolkata Dakshin
- Established: 2011
- Total electors: 2,65,616
- Reservation: None

Member of Legislative Assembly
- 18th West Bengal Legislative Assembly
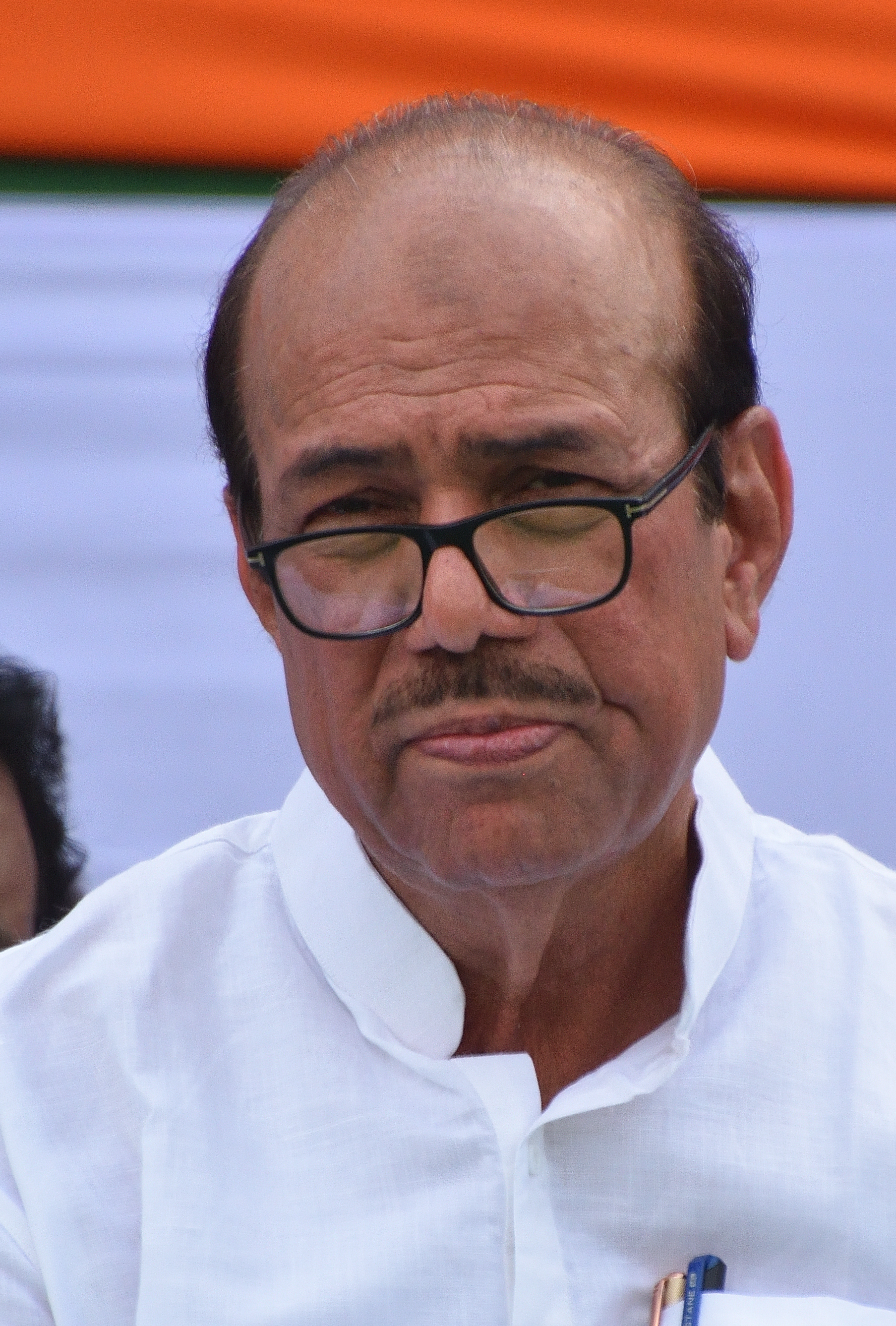
- Incumbent Javed Ahmed Khan
- Party: DTC
- Elected year: 2026

Kasba Assembly constituency is a Legislative Assembly constituency of South 24 Parganas district in the Indian state of West Bengal.

== Overview ==
As per order of the Delimitation Commission in respect of the Delimitation of constituencies in the West Bengal, Kasba Assembly constituency is composed of the following:

- Ward Nos. 66, 67, 91, 92, 107 and 108 of Kolkata Municipal Corporation.

Borough	Ward No.	Councillor	2021 Winner
VII	66	Ahmed Faiz Khan	Trinamool Congress
VII	67	Bijan Lal Mukherjee	Trinamool Congress
X	91	Baiswanor Chatterjee	Trinamool Congress
X	92	Madhuchhanda Deb	Communist Party of India
XII	107	Lipika Manna	Trinamool Congress
XII	108	Sushanta Kumar Ghosh	Trinamool Congress

Kasba Assembly constituency is part of No. 23 Kolkata Dakshin Lok Sabha constituency.

== Members of the Legislative Assembly ==
Election	Name	Party
2011	Javed Ahmed Khan	Trinamool Congress
2016	Javed Ahmed Khan	Trinamool Congress
2021	Javed Ahmed Khan	Trinamool Congress
2026	Javed Ahmed Khan	Trinamool Congress

== Election results ==
=== 2026 ===
2026 West Bengal Legislative Assembly election: Kasba
Party	Candidate	Votes	%	±%
AITC	Javed Ahmed Khan	117,893	48.88	▼5.51
BJP	Sandeep Banerjee	96,919	40.18	▲14.3
CPI(M)	Dipu Das	20,042	8.31	▼9.25
NOTA	None of the above	1,902	0.79	▼0.32
Majority		20,974	8.7	▼19.81
Turnout		241,206	90.78	▲17.92
AITC hold		Swing		

=== 2021 ===
2021 West Bengal Legislative Assembly election: Kasba
Party	Candidate	Votes	%	±%
AITC	Javed Ahmed Khan	121,372	54.39	
BJP	Indranil Khan	57,750	25.88	
CPI(M)	Shatarup Ghosh	39,180	17.56	
NOTA	None of the above	2,476	1.11	
Majority		63,622	28.51	
Turnout		223,154	72.86	
AITC hold		Swing		

=== 2016 ===
2016 West Bengal Legislative Assembly election: Kasba
Party	Candidate	Votes	%	±%
AITC	Javed Ahmed Khan	91,679	47.40	−6.41
CPI(M)	Shatarup Ghosh	79,795	41.30	−0.93
BJP	Bikash Debnath	17,550	9.10	+7.32
NOTA	None of the above	3,713	1.88	
BSP	Lakkhi Yadab (Roy)	1,356	0.70	
Majority		11,884	6.03	
Turnout		1,97,192	73.79	
AITC hold		Swing		

=== 2011 ===
In the 2011 elections, Javed Ahmed Khan of Trinamool Congress defeated his nearest rival Shatarup Ghosh of CPI(M).

2011 West Bengal Legislative Assembly election: Kasba
Party	Candidate	Votes	%	±%
AITC	Javed Ahmed Khan	92,460	53.81	
CPI(M)	Shatarup Ghosh	72,564	42.23	
BJP	Bikash Debnath	3,066	1.78	
IND	Satyajeet Roy	1,401	0.82	
BSP	Susanta Kumar Biswas	1,167	0.68	
Majority		19,889	11.57	
Turnout		1,74,223	77.45	
AITC win (new seat)				
