= Shakuntala Park =

Neighbourhood in Kolkata in West Bengal, India

Sakuntala Park
- Neighbourhood in Sarsuna
- Location in West Bengal
- Coordinates: 22.4838°N 88.2872°E
- Country: India
- State: West Bengal
- City: Kolkata
- District: South 24 Parganas
- Metro Station: Behala Chowrasta
- Municipal Corporation: Kolkata Municipal Corporation
- KMC ward: 127,128

Population
  - Total: For population see linked KMC ward page
- Time zone: UTC+5:30 (IST)
- PIN: 700 061
- Area code: +91 33
- Lok Sabha constituency: Kolkata Dakshin
- Vidhan Sabha constituency: Behala Paschim

Shakuntala Park is a locality in Sarsuna in South Kolkata and lies in the greater Behala region on Biren Roy Road (West). The area falls under Sarsuna pincode area.

== Location ==
It is reachable through Behala Chowrasta or through Budge Budge Trunk Road (from Taratala crossing) and Dakghar / Maheshtala of South 24 Parganas. It starts just two kilometers from Behala Chowrasta and extends up to nearly four kilometers till Oxytown / Shibarampur. It is a predominantly Bengali neighborhood, but from the year 2000 onwards many South Indians, Oriyas, Goans, North Indians also reside in the area. It is bordered by Shakuntala Park area (Patton Tank Factory) in the east and Ketopole to the west. The main road is Biren Roy Road (West) renamed Ho-Chi-Minh Sarani.

== History ==
The area was extremely rural prior to 1972 Bangladesh war. Two people who played a very significant role in shaping this area are Kali Ranjan Thakur Chakraborty, a teacher by profession, and Biru Chakraborty. They named this area Shakuntala Park. The lane which is now called 12 feet road, was originally called Shakuntala Park. Later 16 feet road locality, Kalipur locality, Syamsundar pally locality (1st, 2nd, 3rd lane), Benimaster lane locality, Daspara locality got included and the area is now called Shakuntala Park as a whole.

The West Bengal government's Housing Developments Authority, West Bengal Housing Board developed the township for residential projects, selling vacant plots (2K and 3K series), pre-constructed houses (H2, H1, M1, L and E schemes) and 4 storied apartments as New Shakuntala Park and Swaranika Co-operative Housing Societies. Swaranika consists of 465 flats. The township is divided into 5 zones/ sectors. Also, there are several older locality which later got included under this area like Kalipur locality, Syamsundar pally locality (1st, 2nd, 3rd lane), Benimaster lane locality, Daspara locality, etc.

== Administration ==
The area was under the jurisdiction of sarsuna Police Station and partly under Parnasree Police Station, which is a part of the South West Division of the Kolkata Police Department. There was a Police Outpost situated inside the township beside Mother Dairy booth, Shakuntala Park unit. On 25 February 2014, this outpost was converted into Sarsuna Police Station and the area which was under Thakurpukur PS comes under the jurisdiction of this new police station. The remaining area is under Parnasree PS as it was. This new police station was inaugurated by the then Commissioner of Police, Mr. Surajit Kar Purkayastha, IPS.

== Present Day ==
There are three lakes (in Bengali known as 'jhil', Lake No. 1, 2, and 3 respectively) located within half a kilometer of the township. Lake 1 is beautified and maintained by Kolkata Corporation. Beautification of Lake 2 & 3 is in the pipeline. This is the center of attraction of the locality for its serene and natural ambiance. Apart from the casual visitors, countless morning and evening walkers visit this place daily to rejuvenate. It is also a coveted fishing spot. During 'Chat Puja' North Indians assemble here in scores to offer puja. There are many clubs and associations in the area (six co-operative societies and their clubs), which organize celebrations for Durga Puja, the main Bengali festival, Kali Puja, and all other pujas in their respective puja grounds in different areas of the township. The entire Shakuntala Park Housing area is now a place of growing interest for shooting different films and TV serials.

There is a big playground beside Lake1 named Central Park under the joint supervision of all cooperative societies of the township. A swimming pool is also situated beside Lake1 in Central Park. On the southern end of the township, there are two colleges as Sarsuna College, Law College, and a supermarket named Faayada Store.

== Institutions, Banks and Facilities ==
The Life Insurance Corporation of India has constructed their Zonal Training Institute, Jeevan Vidya, here which is near Muchipara area. Many L.I.C. employees from across India go there to train and stay at the L.I.C. Hostel adjacent to the training institute.

The branches of the following banks are present; Punjab National bank, Punjab & Sind Bank, Allahabad Bank, United Bank of India, Canara Bank (Shakuntala Park branch located at Ketopole), State Bank of India (Shibrampur branch located at Ketopole), and Axis Bank (Shakuntala Park branch located at Shibrampur). The ATMs of the following banks are present; HDFC Bank, ICICI Bank, Axis Bank, SBI, PNB, PSB, and UBI.

There are two local milk bars, Mother Dairy and Metro Dairy.

This area is suffering from water logging during rainy seasons. Though the problem has reduced to a great extent in the area which belongs to Ward No 128 after the construction of underground sewerage lines. The portion which is in Ward No 127 shows no improvement as no underground drainage system is built.

== Transport ==
Government buses are:

S-22(Shakuntala Park to Salt lake Karunamoyee)

S-45(Shakuntala Park to Kolkata Railway Station)

M7B(Oxytown to Howrah)

Private buses are:

12C/1(Shibrampur to Howrah)

18A(Greenfield City to Howrah)

18B/1(Dakghar to china mandir)

Auto Services are there from Behala Chowrasta to Shakuntala Park Bus Terminal, Behala Chowrasta to Shibrampur Bazar and Behala Chowrasta to Dakghar. Also, several shuttle car services are there in between Behala Chowrasta and Shakuntala Park.
