= Regent Park, Kolkata =

Regent Park
- Neighbourhood in Kolkata (Calcutta)
- Location within Kolkata
- Coordinates: 22.4833°N 88.3537°E
- Country: India
- State: West Bengal
- City: Kolkata
- District: Kolkata
- Metro Station: Mahanayak Uttam Kumar, Netaji and Masterda Surya Sen
- Municipal Corporation: Kolkata Municipal Corporation
- KMC ward: 95, 97

Population
  - Total: For population see linked KMC pages
- Time zone: UTC+5:30 (IST)
- PIN: 700 040
- Lok Sabha constituency: Jadavpur
- Vidhan Sabha constituency: Tollyganj

Regent Park is a locality of South Kolkata in West Bengal, India. It is a part of Tollygunge area.

== Geography ==
=== Police district ===
Regent Park police station is in the South Suburban division of Kolkata Police. It is located at 45/D/2A, Moore Avenue, Kolkata-700040.

Patuli Women police station has jurisdiction over all police districts under the jurisdiction of South Suburban Division i.e. Netaji Nagar, Jadavpur, Kasba, Regent Park, Bansdroni, Garfa and Patuli.

Jadavpur, Thakurpukur, Behala, Purba Jadavpur, Tiljala, Regent Park, Metiabruz, Nadial and Kasba police stations were transferred from South 24 Parganas to Kolkata in 2011. Except Metiabruz, all the police stations were split into two. The new police stations are Parnasree, Haridevpur, Garfa, Patuli, Survey Park, Pragati Maidan, Bansdroni and Rajabagan.

== Education ==
=== Schools ===
- G. D. Birla Centre for Education
- The Future Foundation School, Kolkata
