= Netaji metro station =

Kolkata Metro's Blue Line metro station

Netaji
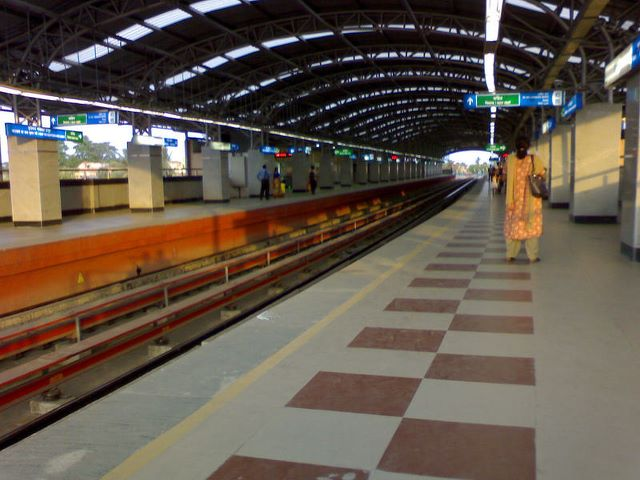

General information
- Location: Chandi Ghosh Rd, Kudghat, Tollygunge; Kolkata, West Bengal 700041; India
- Coordinates: 22.48097°N 88.34600°E
- System: Kolkata Metro
- Operator: Metro Railway, Kolkata
- Line: Blue Line
- Platforms: 2 (2 Side platform)

Construction
- Structure type: Elevated
- Accessible: Yes

Other information
- Station code: KNTJ

History
- Opened: 22 August 2009; 17 years ago
- Former names: Kudghat

Services
Preceding station	Kolkata Metro	Following station
Mahanayak Uttam Kumar towards Dakshineswar	Blue Line	Masterda Surya Sen towards Shahid Khudiram
Route map
Location

Netaji is an elevated metro station on the North-South corridor of the Blue Line of Kolkata Metro in Kolkata, West Bengal, India. It is situated in Kudghat area of Tollygunge. This station is named after the freedom fighter Netaji Subhas Chandra Bose.

== History ==
In 1999–2000, the extension of Blue Line along an elevated corridor from Tollygunge to New Garia, with six stations, was sanctioned at a cost of ₹907 crore (equivalent to ₹39 billion or US$400 million in 2023). The section was constructed and opened in two phases, Mahanayak Uttam Kumar to Kavi Nazrul in 2009 and Kavi Nazrul to Kavi Subhash in 2010. The latest extension opened was the 2.59 km (1.61 mi) stretch from Dum Dum to Noapara on 10 July 2013.

== Station layout ==
L2	Side platform, Doors will open on the left
L2	Platform 2	Train towards Shahid Khudiram (Masterda Surya Sen) →
L2	Platform 1	← Train towards Dakshineswar (Mahanayak Uttam Kumar)
L2	Side platform, Doors will open on the left
L1	Concourse	Fare control, station agent, Metro QR ticket vending machines, crossover
G	Street level	Exit/Entrance

== Connections ==
=== Bus ===
Kudghat Bus stand is serving near Netaji metro station. Bus route number 208, S17A, S2, V1, AC47, AC17B, D40, SBSTC Kudghat to Tarapith, SBSTC Kudghat to Jhargram, SBSTC Kudghat to Digha, etc. are serving near the station

== See also ==
- Kolkata
- List of Kolkata Metro stations
- Transport in Kolkata
- Kolkata Metro Rail Corporation
- Kolkata Suburban Railway
- Kolkata Monorail
- Trams in Kolkata
- Garia
- Tollygunge
- E.M. Bypass
- List of rapid transit systems
- List of metro systems
