= Netaji Nagar, Kolkata =

Netaji Nagar
- Neighbourhood in Kolkata (Calcutta)
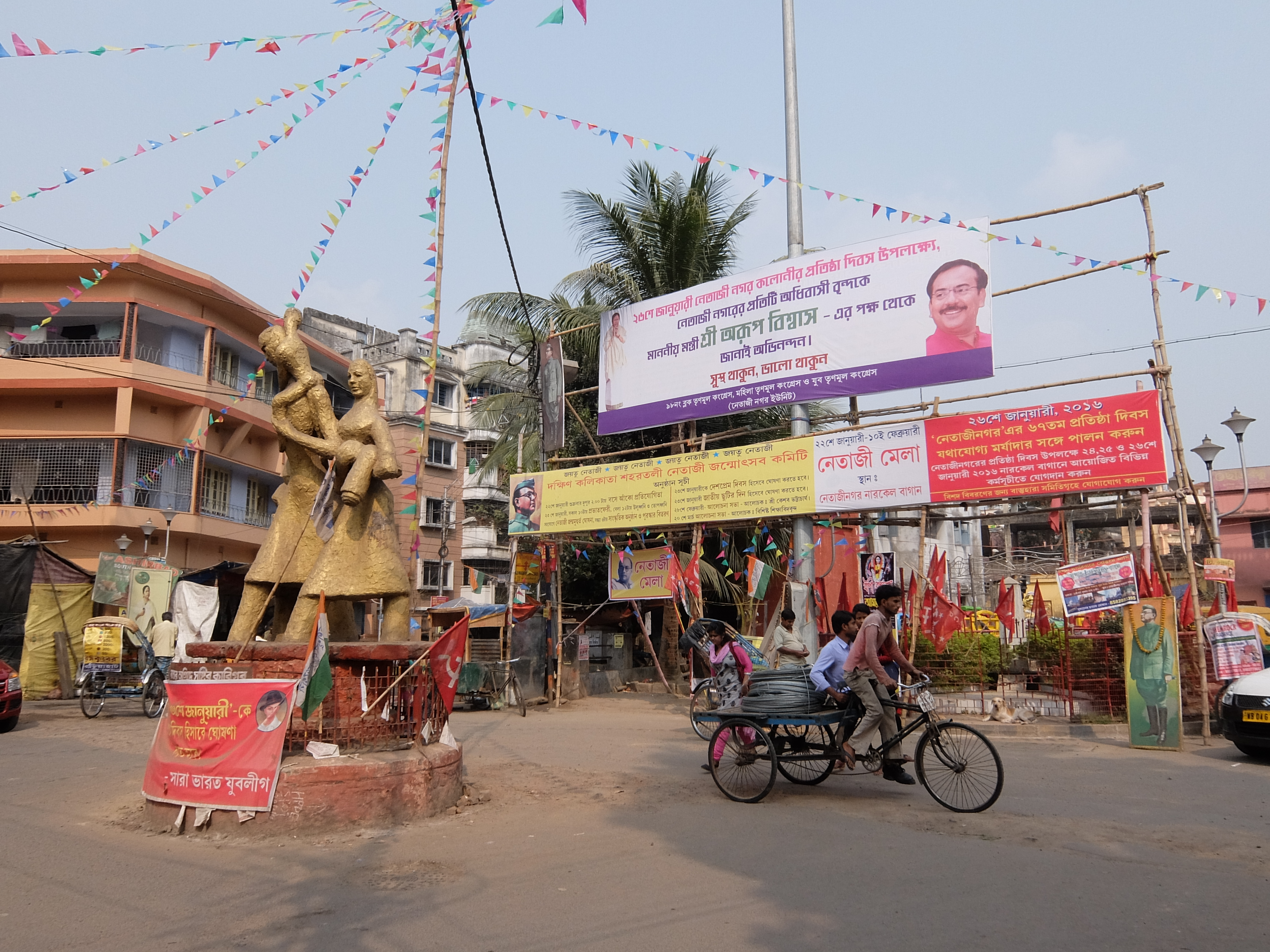
- Narkelbagan, Netaji Nagar's main crossroads
- Interactive map of Netaji Nagar
- Coordinates: 22°28′51″N 88°21′36″E
- Country: India
- State: West Bengal
- City: Kolkata
- District: Kolkata
- Metro Station: Mahanayak Uttam Kumar and Masterda Surya Sen
- Municipal Corporation: Kolkata Municipal Corporation
- KMC ward: 98

Population
  - Total: For population see linked KMC pages
- Time zone: UTC+5:30 (IST)
- PIN: 700040, 700092
- Area code: +91 33
- Lok Sabha constituency: Jadavpur
- Vidhan Sabha constituency: Tollyganj

Netaji Nagar is a locality of South Kolkata in West Bengal, India. It is a part of Tollygunge area. It is named after the famous freedom fighter Netaji Subhash Chandra Bose.

== Geography ==
=== Police district ===
Netaji Nagar police station is in the South Suburban division of Kolkata Police. It is located at 9, Puratan Bazar, Hari Mohan Primary School, Kolkata-700092.

In 2014, Netaji Nagar police station was carved out of the jurisdiction of Patuli police station.

Patuli Women police station has jurisdiction over all police districts under the jurisdiction of South Suburban Division i.e. Netaji Nagar, Jadavpur, Kasba, Regent Park, Bansdroni, Garfa and Patuli.

=== Location and neighbourhood ===
It predominantly has lower to medium class residential area. Most of the people are Bengali Hindu refugee from East Pakistan, who were given land by government to rehabilitate them. They have settled here after 1947 partition of India. In the recent times people of all ethnicity including the old refugees live here. Starting from a refugee colony, the locality has grown both in size and facilities and has become one of the most Important localities of South Kolkata.

Recently, many Gujarati diaspora of Kolkata have preferred to live in this locality, who have shifted from prime Bhowanipore area of city and have also built a Jain temple in locality.

The PIN code for this area is 700040/92.

== Education ==
Among educational institution are Netaji Nagar Day College, Netaji Nagar College for Women and Netaji Nagar Evening College, The Future Foundation School, Kolkata, Narmada School, Netaji Nagar Vidya Mandir & Netaji Nagar Balika Vidyamamdir.

== Transport ==
The area is served by large arterial road named Netaji Subhash Chandra Bose Road, which connects Tollygunge to Garia. The area is located on the Blue Line Metro, which connects Garia with Dakhineswar. The nearest Metro staions are Tollygunj Metro Station and Masterda Surya Sen metro station (Bansdroni).

== Culture ==
There was a cinema hall named Malancha nearby, which was a major landmark before its services were shut down.
