= Gitanjali metro station =

Kolkata Metro's Blue Line metro station

Gitanjali
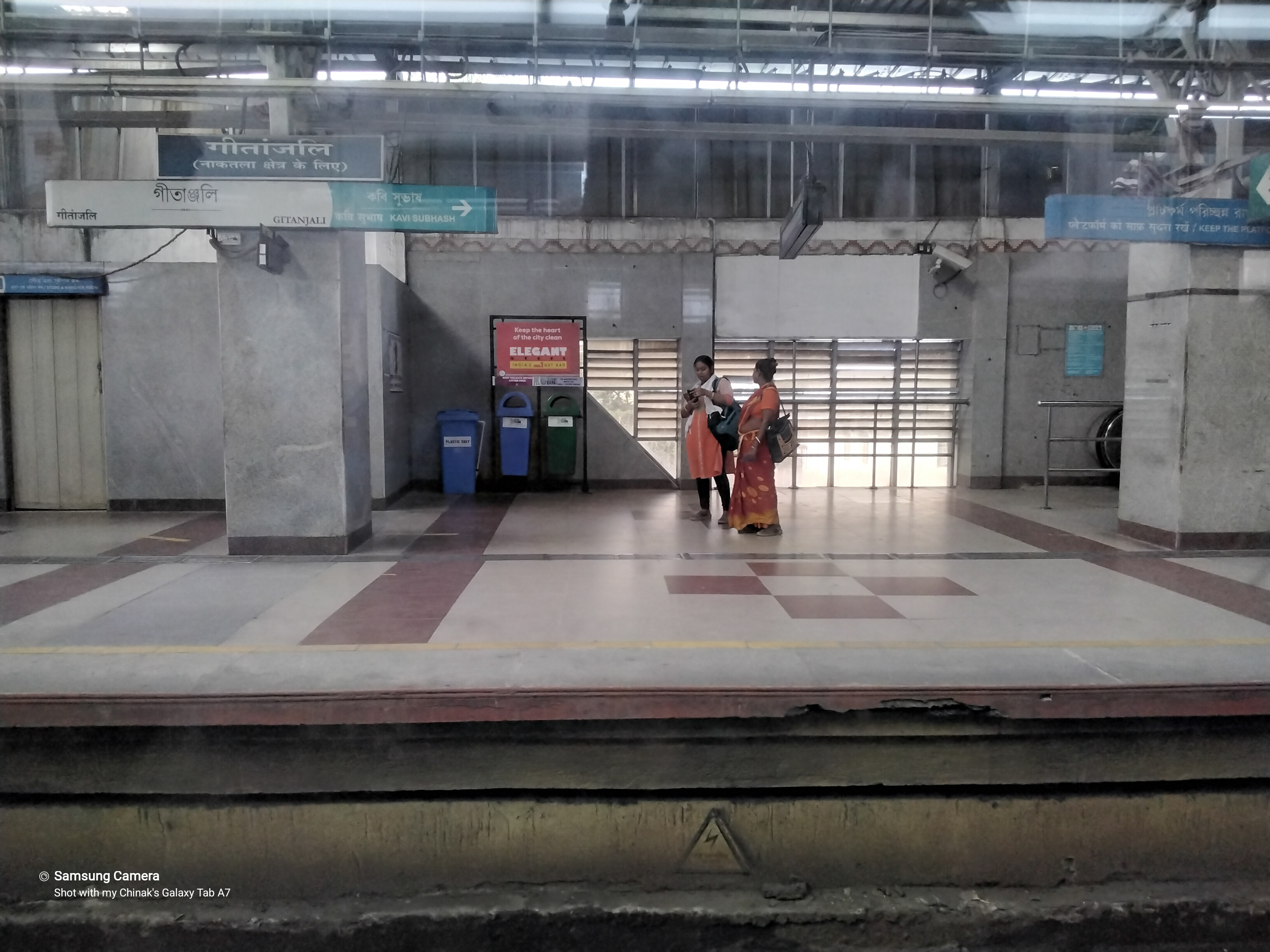
- Gitanjali Metro station

General information
- Location: Netaji Subhash Chandra Bose Road, Naktala, Garia, Kolkata, West Bengal 700047; India
- Coordinates: 22.469426°N 88.369985°E
- System: Kolkata Metro station
- Owner: Metro Railway, Kolkata
- Operator: Kolkata Metro
- Line: Blue Line
- Platforms: Side platform Platform-1 → Dakshineswar; Platform-2 → Kavi Subhash
- Tracks: 2

Construction
- Structure type: Elevated, Double track
- Platform levels: 2
- Accessible: Yes

Other information
- Station code: KGTN

History
- Opened: 22 August 2009; 17 years ago
- Former names: Naktala
Services
Preceding station	Kolkata Metro	Following station
Masterda Surya Sen towards Dakshineswar	Blue Line	Kavi Nazrul towards Shahid Khudiram
Route map
Location

Gitanjali is an elevated metro station on the North-South corridor of the Blue Line of Kolkata Metro in Naktala, Garia, Kolkata, West Bengal, India. It is named after the famous 'Gitanjali' or Song Offerings, a collection of 103 English poems, largely translations, of the Bengali poet Rabindranath Tagore.

== Station layout ==
G	Street Level	Exit/Entrance
L1	Mezzanine	Fare control, station agent, Metro Card vending machines, crossover
L2	Side platform | Doors will open on the left
L2	Platform 2 Southbound	Towards → Shahid Khudiram next station is Kavi Nazrul
L2	Platform 1 Northbound	Towards ← Dakshineshwar next station is Masterda Surya Sen
L2	Side platform | Doors will open on the left
L2

== Connections ==
=== Bus ===
Bus route number 80A, 228, SD5, S112 (Mini), S113 (Mini), AC6, S6A, S7 etc. serve the station.

== See also ==
- Kolkata
- List of Kolkata Metro stations
- Transport in Kolkata
- Kolkata Metro Rail Corporation
- Kolkata Suburban Railway
- Kolkata Monorail
- Trams in Kolkata
- Garia
- E.M. Bypass
- List of rapid transit systems
- List of metro systems
