= Mahanayak Uttam Kumar metro station =

Metro station in Kolkata, India

Mahanayak Uttam Kumar
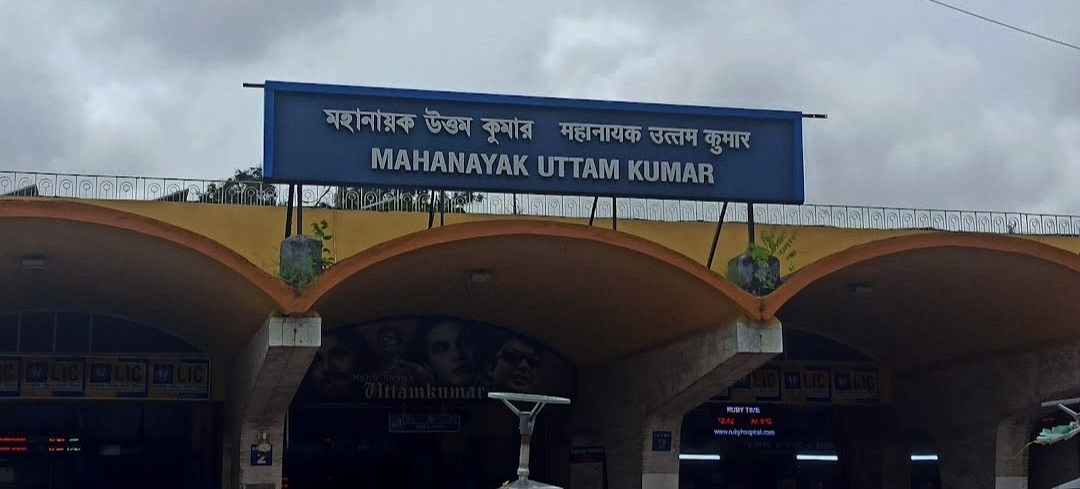
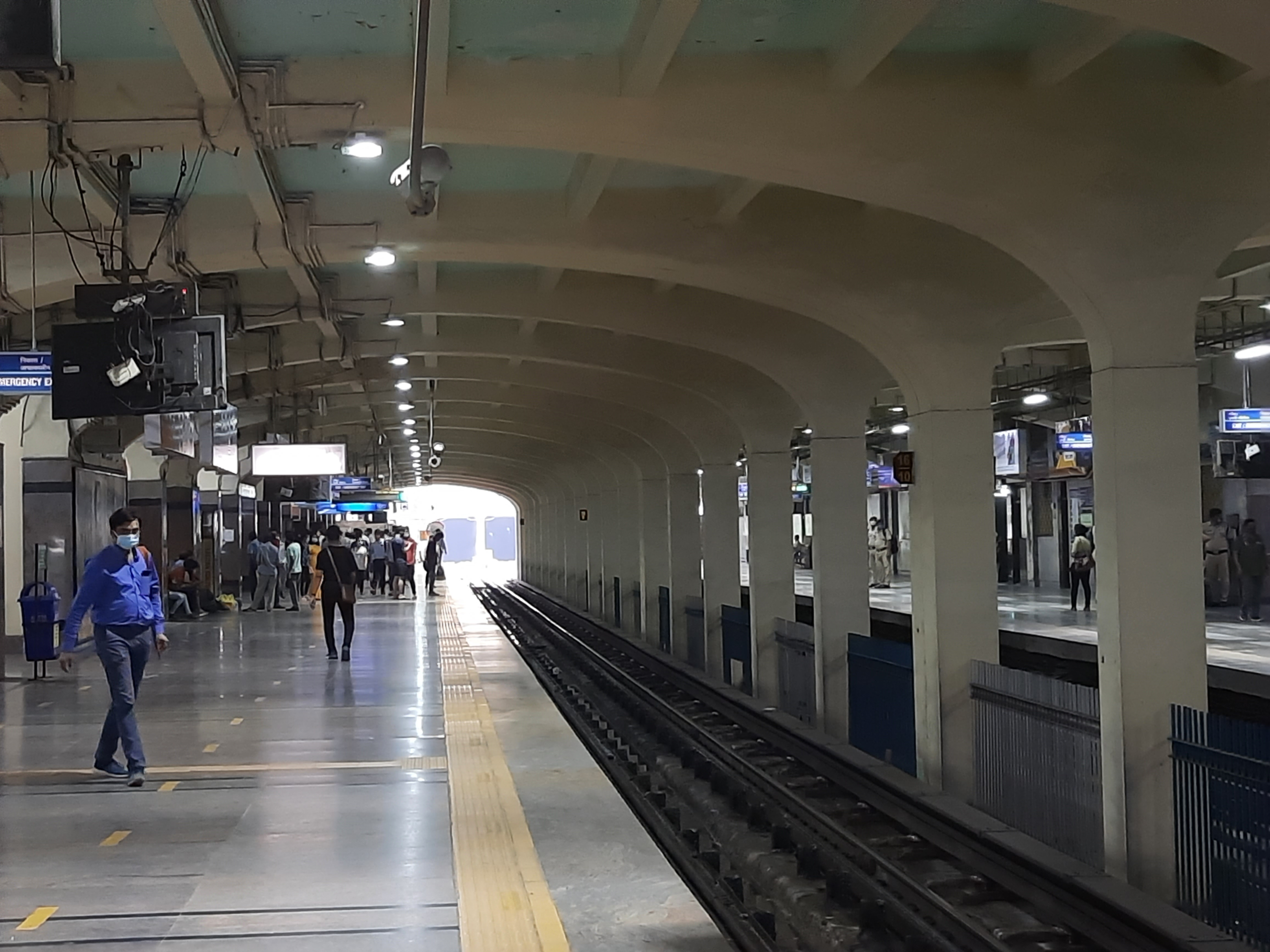
- Mahanayak Uttam Kumar metro station

General information
- Location: Deshapran Sashmal Rd, Tollygunge; Kolkata, West Bengal 700040; India
- Coordinates: 22.49445°N 88.34515°E
- System: Kolkata Metro
- Operator: Metro Railway, Kolkata
- Lines: Blue Line; Purple Line
- Platforms: 2 (2 Side platforms)
- Tracks: 3
- Connections: Tollygunge Bus Terminal; Tollygunge Tram Depot

Construction
- Structure type: At Grade, Double track
- Parking: Yes

Other information
- Station code: KMUK

History
- Opened: 29 April 1986; 40 years ago
- Former names: Tollygunge

Services
Preceding station	Kolkata Metro	Following station
Rabindra Sarobar towards Dakshineswar	Blue Line	Netaji towards Shahid Khudiram
Route map
Location

Mahanayak Uttam Kumar (formerly known as Tollygunge) is an at-grade level metro station on the North-South corridor of the Blue Line of Kolkata Metro in Tollygunge, Kolkata, West Bengal, India. The station is named after Uttam Kumar, one of the most famous names of Indian Bengali Cinema. It will be a third interchange metro station between Blue Line and Purple Line in the future after Park Street and Esplanade metro stations.

The Tollygunge Golf Club is on the west side of the station, the Royal Calcutta Golf Club lies less than a kilometre to the east and ITC Sangeet Research Academy is a short distance south along the Deshapran Sashmal Road at Netaji Subash Chandra Bose Road.

== Station layout ==
G	Street Level	Exit/ Entrance, Fare control, station agent, Ticket/token, shops
G	Side platform, Doors will open on the left
G	Platform 2	Train towards Shahid Khudiram (Netaji) →
G	Platform 1	← Train towards Dakshineswar (Rabindra Sarobar)
G	Island platform, P1 Doors will open on the left, P-1A Doors will open on the right
G	Platform 1A	Train towards Shahid Khudiram (Netaji) →
UG	Underground Crossover

== Connections ==
=== Bus ===
Bus route number 12C/1B, 40A, 40B, 41, 41B, 47/1, 80A, 205, 205A, 208, 228, SD5, S112 (Mini), S113 (Mini), S114 (Mini), S117 (Mini), S188 (Mini), C8, C14/1, M7B, M16, M16A, M18, S2, S4C, S6A, S7, S17A, S31, AC4B, AC6, AC16, AC31, AC47, V1, V9, ST6 etc. serve the station.

=== Tram ===
Tram route number 24/29 serves the station.

== See also ==
- Kolkata
- List of Kolkata Metro stations
- Transport in Kolkata
- Kolkata Metro Rail Corporation
- Kolkata Suburban Railway
- Kolkata Monorail
- Trams in Kolkata
- Garia
- Tollygunge
- E.M. Bypass
- List of rapid transit systems
- List of metro systems

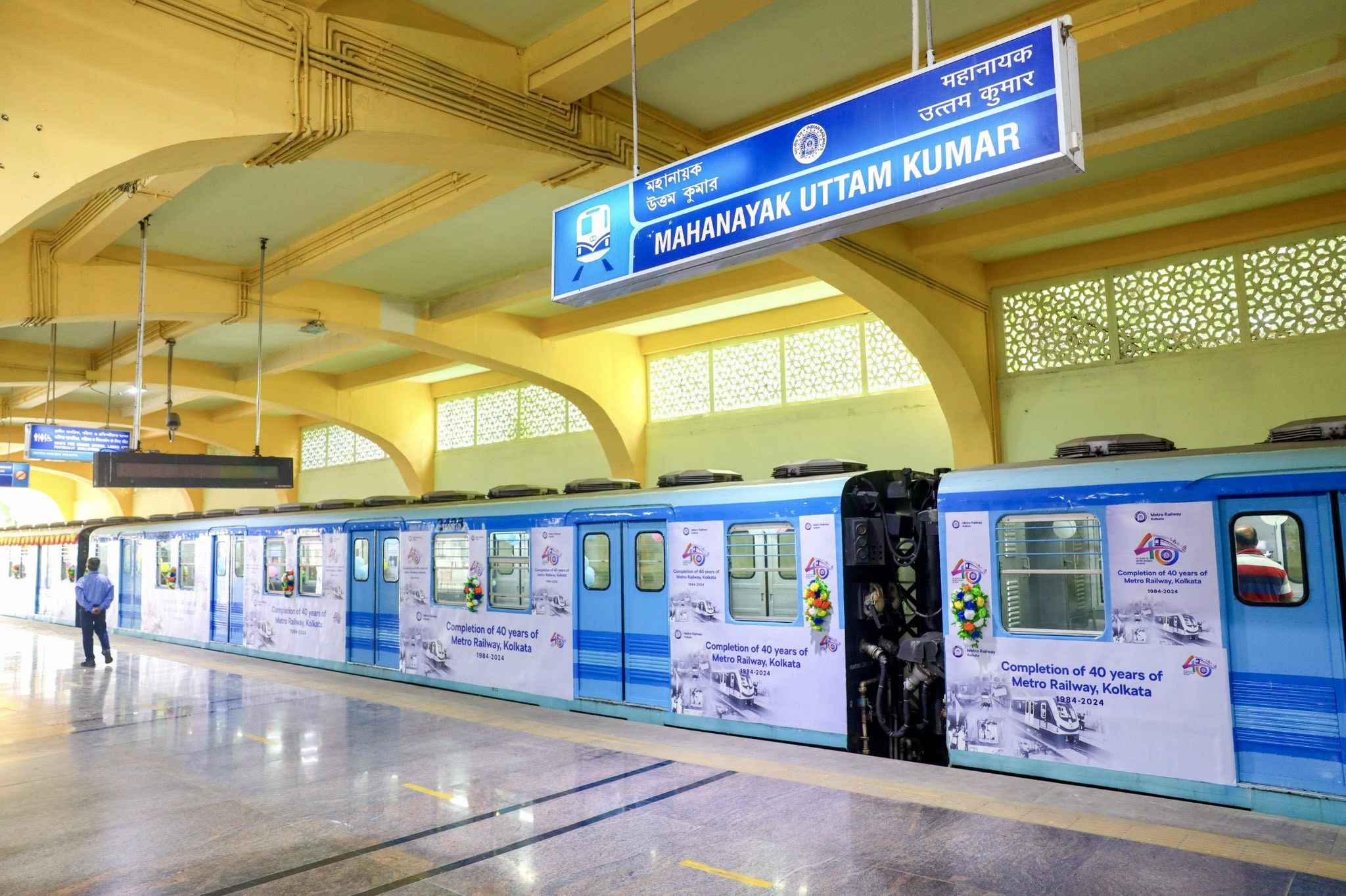
A non air conditioned metro rake stationed at Mahanayak Uttam Kumar metro station on the occasion of 40th anniversary of Kolkata Metro
