= Naktala =

- Neighbourhood in Kolkata (Calcutta)
- Location in Kolkata Naktala (West Bengal) Naktala (India)
- Coordinates: 22°28′27″N 88°22′03″E
- Country: India
- State: West Bengal
- City: Kolkata
- District: Kolkata
- Metro Station: Gitanjali
- KMC wards: 98, 100

Government
  - Type: Municipal Corporation
  - Body: Kolkata Municipal Corporation

Languages
  - Official: Bengali, English
- Time zone: UTC+5:30 (IST)
- PIN: 700047
- Telephone code: +91 33
- Lok Sabha constituency: Jadavpur
- Vidhan Sabha constituency: Tollygunge

Naktala is a neighbourhood of South Kolkata in West Bengal, India. It is a part of Garia neighbourhood.

== History ==
Previously forest, swampland and a peaceful rural area, dotted with ponds and the occasional dak bungalow (the erstwhile Dalgis bungalow) in between, Naktala is located by the Tolly's Nullah (Adi Ganga canal) connecting Kolkata to the Vidhyadhari River to the east. It has evolved with time from a sleepy to a bustling neighbourhood, burgeoned and prospered with the arrival of people from all over, mainly East Bengal after independence. The name is supposed to have originated from Nagtala (Nag meaning Snake, a place of snakes) according to one source and from Nak meaning Swarga (Heaven).

== Transport ==
Naktala is connected by road and metro railway to the other parts of Kolkata. Many buses like AC Bus (AC6), CSTC Buses (S6A, S7), Private Buses (80A, 228, SD5), Naktala - Howrah Mini Bus, Harinavi - Howrah Mini Bus etc. ply on Netaji Subhash Chandra Bose Road (NSC Bose Road). The closest metro station is Gitanjali.

== Education ==
Naktala is rich in schools, with colleges mostly in Garia, Netaji Nagar and elsewhere. The schools are :

- Mukul Bose Memorial Institution
- Ananda Ashram Balika Vidyapith
- Maharishi Vidya Mandir
- Bani Bhavan High School
- Shri R K Ananda Ashram Girls School
- Khanpur Girls High School
- All Saints Academy
- Naktala High School
- B.D. Memorial School, Bansdroni

== Culture ==
Durga Puja is celebrated at Naktala. The acclaimed and award-winning Naktala Udayan Sangha Durga Puja celebrated in the Udayan Sangha grounds adds to the pride of Naktala.

== Healthcare ==
Naktala has several nursing homes and hospitals.

- Acharya Durga Prasanna Paramahamsa Sebayatan
- BC Roy Polio Clinic and Hospital for Crippled Children
- Sevangan Medical Complex
- Nidan Poly Clinic
- Springdale Health Care Unit

== See also ==
- Kolkata Metro Railway Routes (North South Corridor)

== Notable persons ==
1. Abdur Razzak, Bangladeshi actor
2. Damayanti Sen, IPS
3. Kabir Suman, singer and former Member of Parliament
4. Ustad Rashid Khan, Hindusthani Classical Vocalist
5. Krishanu Dey, footballer
6. Tapas Sen, acclaimed stage lighting designer
7. Gautam Chattopadhyay, Moheener Ghoraguli
