= Netaji (disambiguation) =

Netaji is an honorific associated with 20th-century Indian nationalist leader and politician Subhas Chandra Bose.

Netaji or Nethaji may also refer to:

== People ==
- Netaji Palkar, Sarsenapati (Commander in Chief) of the Maratha Empire

== Culture ==
- Netaji (TV series), a 2019 Indian soap opera about the life of Subhash Chandra Bose
- Netaji (film), Indian Irula-language film
- Netaji (magazine), Indian magazine published in Tamil
- Nethaji, Indian Tamil-language film

== See also ==
- Netaji Nagar (disambiguation)
- Chandrabose (disambiguation)
- Netaji Subhash Place metro station, Delhi Metro, India
