= Chandrabose =

Chandrabose or Chandra Bose may refer to:

- Chandrabose (lyricist), Indian lyricist who writes songs for Tollywood films
- Chandrabose (composer) (1950–2010), Indian composer who wrote songs for Kollywood films
- Chandrabose Suthaharan, Sri Lankan Tamil editor of the Tamil magazine Nilam
- Subhas Chandra Bose, Indian nationalist and Axis collaborator during World War II
- Sarat Chandra Bose, barrister, elder brother and supporter of Subhash Chandra Bose
- Jagadish Chandra Bose, Bengali polymath: a physicist, biologist, botanist, archaeologist, and writer of science fiction
- Raj Chandra Bose, Indian mathematician and statistician best known for his work in design theory and the theory of error-correcting codes
- N.S.Chandra Bose, former President of the Indian Medical Association and former President of the Tamil Nadu State Bharatiya Janata Party

== Places ==
- Netaji Subhash Chandra Bose International Airport, an airport located in Dum Dum, near Kolkata, West Bengal, India
- Netaji Subash Chandra Bose Road, an important thoroughfare in South Kolkata, which connects the localities of Tollygunge and Garia

== Films ==
- Netaji Subhas Chandra Bose: The Forgotten Hero, a 2005 Indian English-language film directed by Shyam Benegal
- Subash Chandra Bose (film), a 2005 Indian Telugu-language film directed by K. Raghavendra

== See also ==
- Netaji (disambiguation)
