= Benubana Chhaya =

Park in Kolkata, India

Benubana Chhaya বেণুবন ছায়া
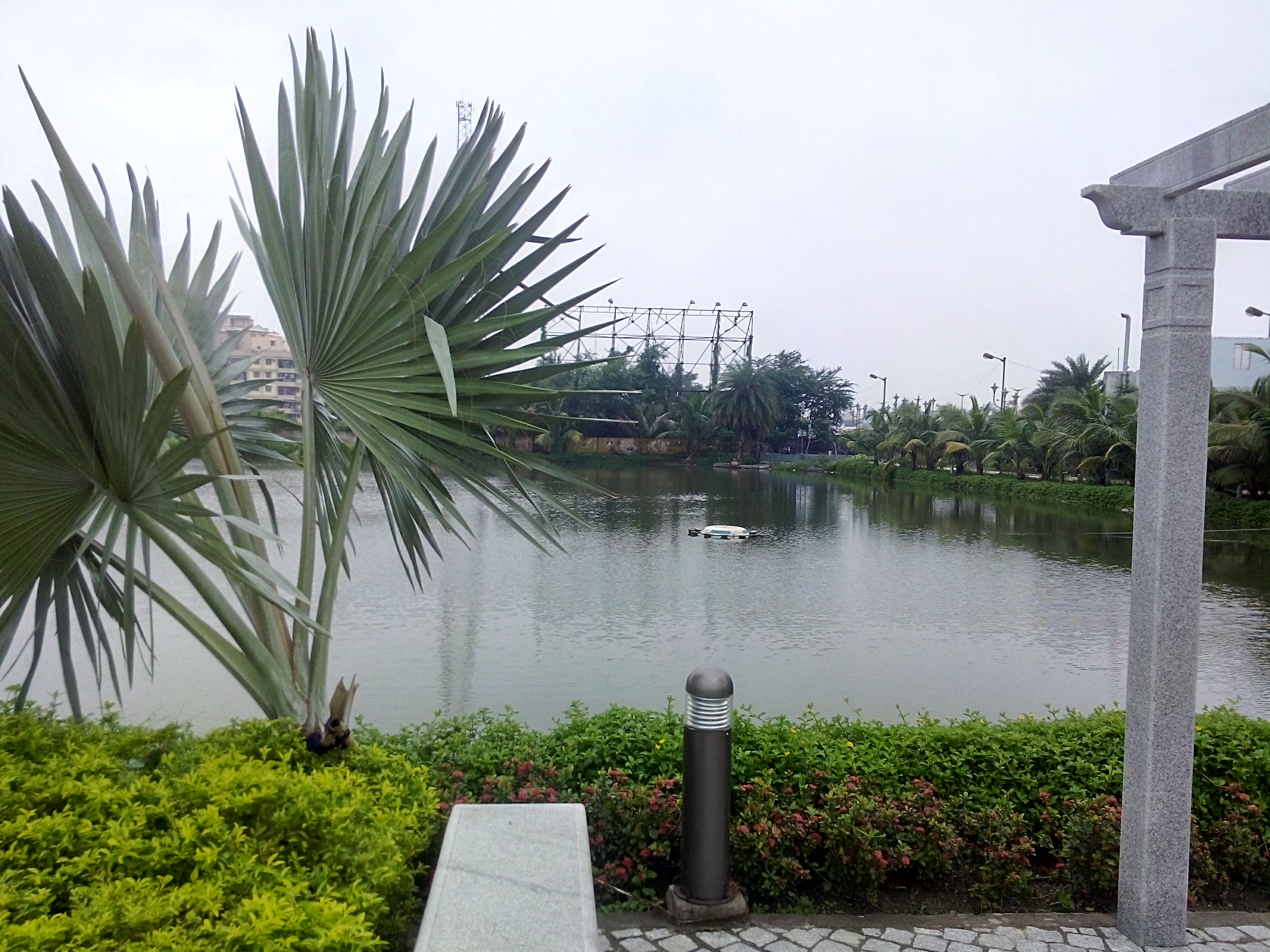
- Lake in park
- Interactive map of Benubana Chhaya বেণুবন ছায়া
- Type: Urban park
- Location: Baishnabghata Patuli Township, Kolkata
- Coordinates: 22°28′34″N 88°23′22″E
- Opened: 2013
- Operator: Kolkata Metropolitan Development Authority
- Open: All year (10:00 am - 9:00 pm)

Benubana Chhaya is a categorized water park in Kolkata located at EM Bypass, Baishnabghata Patuli Township. It has been developed by Kolkata Metropolitan Development Authority (KMDA) in 2013 for beatification of Kolkata. It is a Public Park built around a lake and has a tree lined path flanked by lakes on either side. The park is a peaceful destination to spend time with family and friends. Visitors can also take a boat ride, and visit a tram restaurant located inside the park. One needs to buy a ticket to enter the park and the price for the ticket is Rs10 per person.
