= Netaji Nagar =

Netaji Nagar may refer to these places in India named after "Netaji" Subhas Chandra Bose:

- Netaji Nagar, Delhi
- Netaji Nagar, Kolkata

== See also ==
- Netaji (disambiguation)
