= Masterda Surya Sen metro station =

Kolkata Metro's Blue Line metro station

Masterda Surya Sen
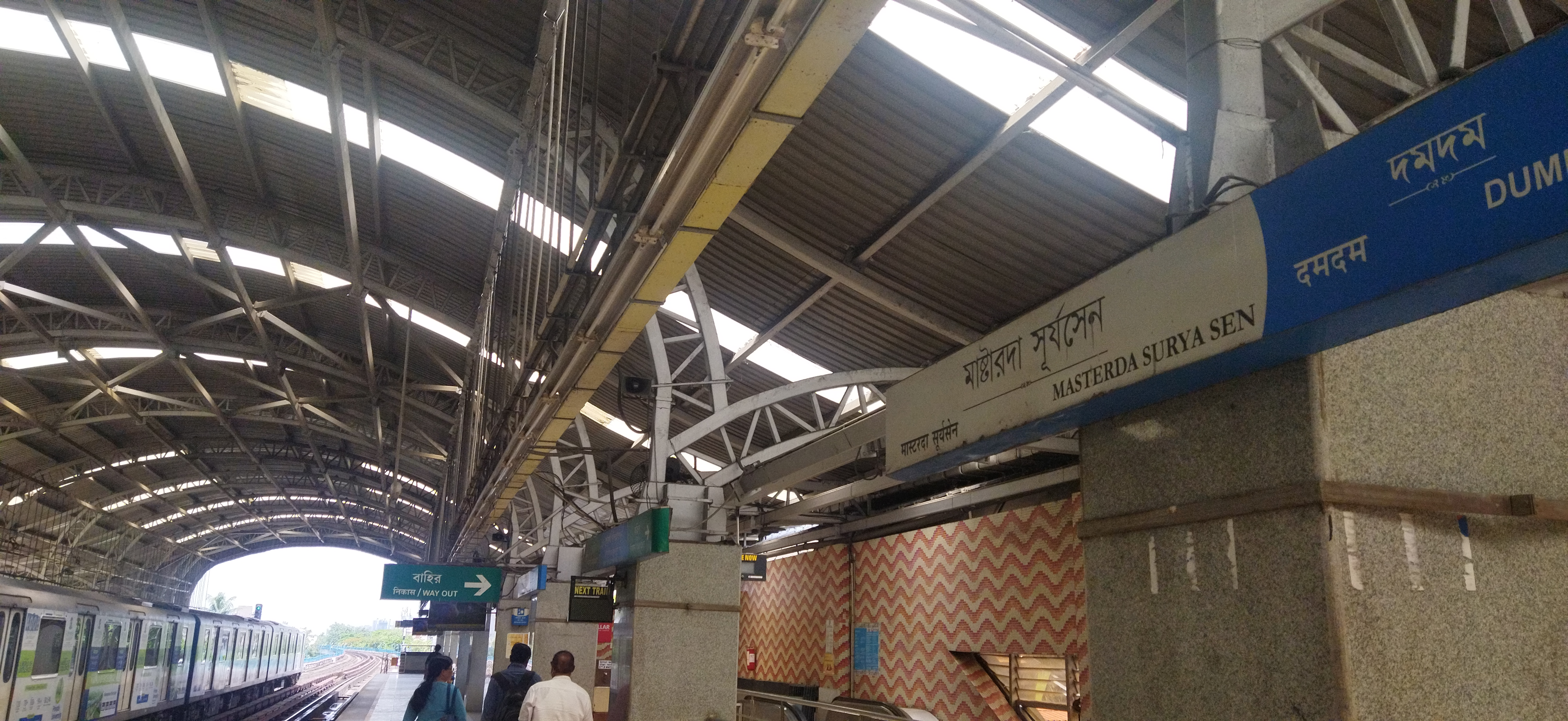
- Masterda Surya Sen metro station

General information
- Location: Bansdroni Post office Rd, Bansdroni, Kolkata, West Bengal 700070; India
- Coordinates: 22.473521°N 88.360871°E
- System: Kolkata Metro station
- Owner: Metro Railway, Kolkata
- Operator: Kolkata Metro
- Line: Blue Line
- Platforms: Side platform Platform-1 → Dakshineswar; Platform-2 → Kavi Subhash
- Tracks: 2

Construction
- Structure type: Elevated, Double track
- Platform levels: 2
- Accessible: Yes

Other information
- Station code: KMSN

History
- Opened: 22 August 2009; 17 years ago
- Former names: Bansdroni
Services
Preceding station	Kolkata Metro	Following station
Netaji towards Dakshineswar	Blue Line	Gitanjali towards Shahid Khudiram
Route map
Location

Masterda Surya Sen is an elevated metro station on the North-South corridor of the Blue Line of Kolkata Metro in Kolkata, West Bengal, India. It is located in Bansdroni area. The Metro Station is named in the memory of Surya Sen.

== Station layout ==
G	Street Level	Exit/Entrance
L1	Mezzanine	Fare control, station agent, Metro Card vending machines, crossover
L2	Side platform | Doors will open on the left
L2	Platform 2 Southbound	Towards → Shahid Khudiram next station is Gitanjali
L2	Platform 1 Northbound	Towards ← Dakshineshwar next station is Netaji
L2	Side platform | Doors will open on the left
L2

== Connections ==
=== Bus ===
Bus route number 80A, 205, 205A, 228, SD5, S112 (Mini), S113 (Mini), AC6, S6A, S7 etc. serve the station.

== See also ==
- Kolkata
- List of Kolkata Metro stations
- Transport in Kolkata
- Kolkata Metro Rail Corporation
- Kolkata Suburban Railway
- Kolkata Monorail
- Trams in Kolkata
- Garia
- E.M. Bypass
- List of rapid transit systems
- List of metro systems
