= Kannagi (disambiguation) =

Kannagi is a legendary woman who forms the central character of the Tamil epic Silapathikaram.

Kannagi or Kannaki may also refer to:

- Kannagi, the queen of the Velir chieftain Pegan of the family of Vel Avi
- Kannaki Amman, the divine form of the Silappatikaram character
- Kannagi (1942 film), an Indian Tamil-language epic film
- Kannagi (2023 film), an Indian film by Yashwanth Kishore
- Kannagi (newspaper), a Tamil-language newspaper in India
- Kannagi (Shinto), the Japanese term for a shaman or a miko
- Kannagi: Crazy Shrine Maidens, a 2005 Japanese manga series by Eri Takenashi that was adapted into a 2008 anime television series
- Kannaki (film), a 2001 Indian Malayalam-language film by Jayaraj
