= Kavi Nazrul metro station =

Kolkata Metro's Blue Line metro station

Kavi Nazrul
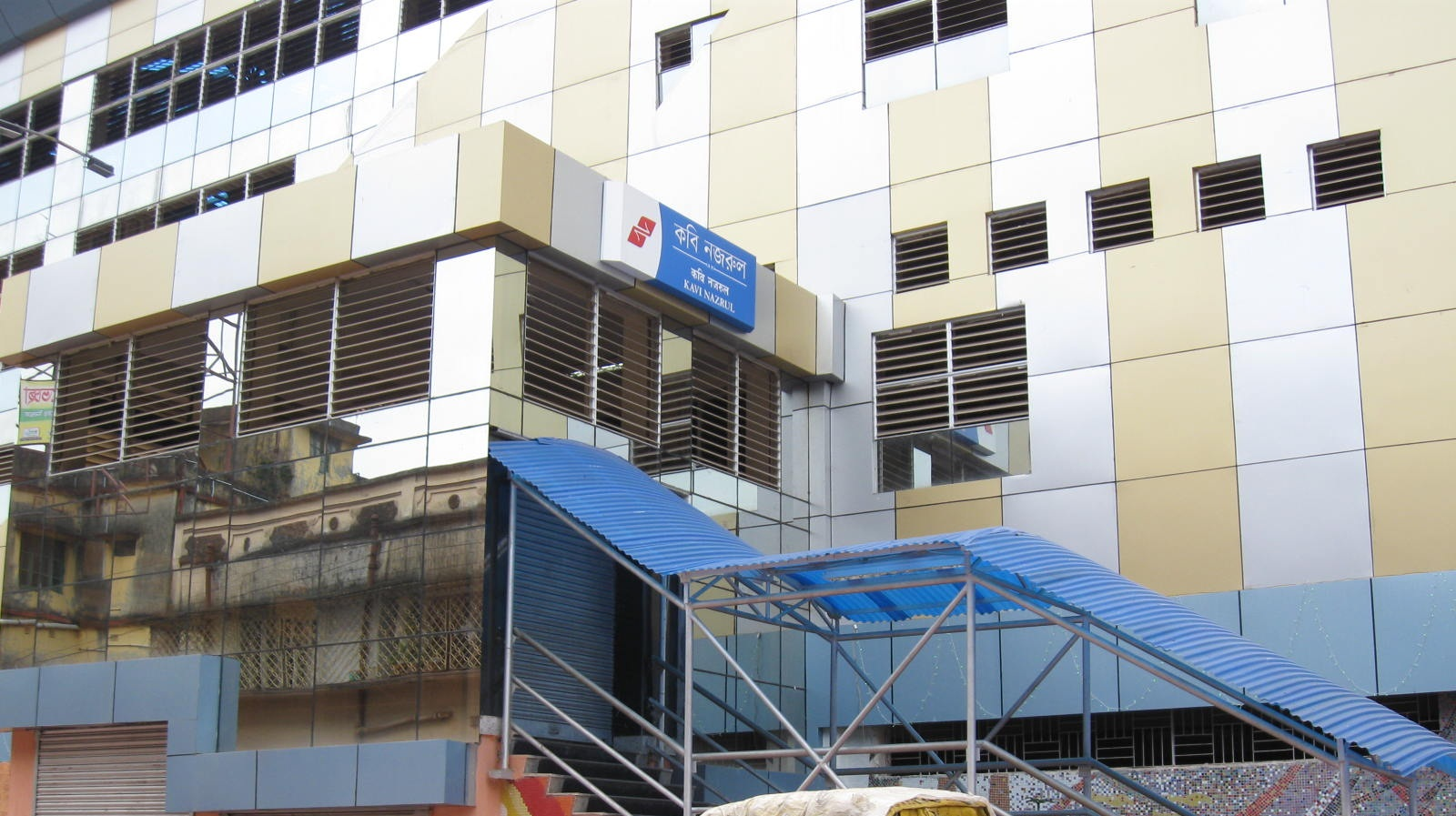
- Garia Bazar Metro Station

General information
- Location: Canal Side Road, Garia; Kolkata, West Bengal 700084; India
- Coordinates: 22.46417°N 88.38055°E
- System: Kolkata Metro
- Operator: Metro Railway, Kolkata
- Line: Blue Line
- Platforms: 2 (2 Side platform)

Construction
- Structure type: Elevated
- Accessible: Yes

Other information
- Station code: KKNZ

History
- Opened: 22 August 2009; 17 years ago
- Former names: Garia Bazar

Services
| Preceding station | Kolkata Metro | Following station |
|---|---|---|
| Gitanjali towards Dakshineswar | Blue Line | Shahid Khudiram Terminus |
Route map
Location

Kavi Nazrul (formerly known as Garia Bazar) is an elevated metro station on the North-South corridor of the Blue Line of Kolkata Metro in Garia, Kolkata, West Bengal, India. The metro station is named after the Bengali poet Kazi Nazrul Islam, who is the national poet of Bangladesh.

== Station layout ==
| L2 | Side platform, Doors will open on the left |
| L2 | Platform 2 | Train towards Shahid Khudiram (Shahid Khudiram) → |
| L2 | Platform 1 | ← Train towards Dakshineswar (Gitanjali) |
| L2 | Side platform, Doors will open on the left |
| L1 | Concourse | Fare control, station agent, Metro QR ticket vending machines, crossover |
| G | Street level | Exit/Entrance |

== Connections ==
=== Bus ===
Garia bus stand is located nearby and serves the station.

Bus route number 80A, 80B, 218, 228, SD5, KB17, JM4, 007, M8/1 (Mini), S101 (Mini), S112 (Mini), S113(Mini), C43, S5, S6A, S7, S14, S15G, S21, AC37, AC5, AC6, AC37A, AC50, AC50A etc. serve near the station.

== See also ==
- Kolkata
- List of Kolkata Metro stations
- Transport in Kolkata
- Kolkata Metro Rail Corporation
- Kolkata Suburban Railway
- Kolkata Monorail
- Trams in Kolkata
- Garia
- E.M. Bypass
- List of rapid transit systems
- List of metro systems
