= Indrapuri Studio =

Indian film studio

Indrapuri Studios is a film and television studio located in 4, Netaji Subhash Chandra Bose Road, Tollygunge, Kolkata.

== History ==
This is one of the oldest and busiest Bengali film studios of Kolkata. Indrapuri Studios was established in 1935 and currently managed and owned by Sanjeev Bubna and Tejash Doshi, Tejash Doshi is the Managing Director of Indrapuri Studios Private Limited. The studio is spread over two acres and has 6 Studio Floors.

Indrapuri Studio
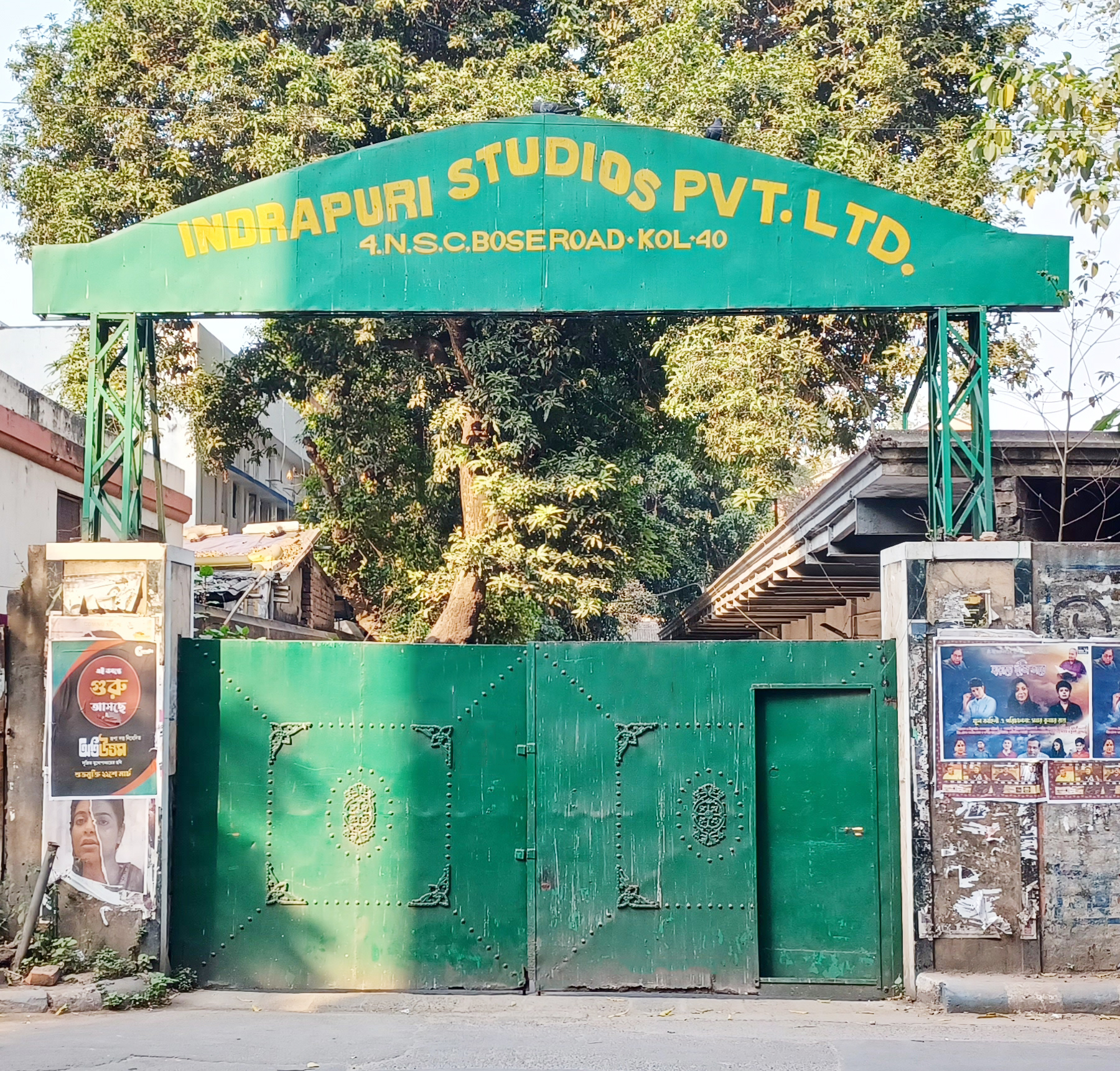
- Address: Netaji Subhash Chandra Bose Rd, Jubilee Park, Jubeeli Park, Tollygunge, Kolkata, West Bengal 700040; India
- Owner: Dharma Productions; Yash Raj Films; Excel Entertainment; T-Series; Tiger Baby Films; Salman Khan Films; Red Chillies Entertainment; Vishesh Films; Eros International; AA Films; Junglee Pictures; Nadiadwala Grandson Entertainment

== Inspirations ==
The studio plays a vital role in Gaurav Pandey's Bengali film Shukno Lanka (2010). Pandey, the director of the film told in an interview– "This comes from my love for Calcutta. Indrapuri Studios, which appears in the film so many times, is the cornerstone of cinema in Calcutta. My obsession with Indrapuri Studios began from the knowledge that Satyajitbabu (Ray) made a lot of his films there."
