= Netaji Nagar College =

College in West Bengal, India

- Type: Undergraduate college
- Established: 25 September 1967; 58 years ago
- Affiliations: University of Calcutta
- Principal: Dr. Sujatra Bhattacharyya
- Location: 170, 436, Netaji Subhash Chandra Bose Rd, Gandhi Colony, Netaji Nagar, Kolkata, West Bengal, 700092, India; 22.4821214°N 88.3571161°E
- Campus: Urban
- Website: Netaji Nagar College
- Location within Kolkata Location within India

Netaji Nagar College, established in 1967, is an undergraduate college in Kolkata, West Bengal, India. It is affiliated with the University of Calcutta.

== History ==
The eventful career of the Netaji Nagar College began on 25 September 1967 with evening classes arranged in the premises of the Netaji Nagar Vidyamandir. Construction of the college building began within three years’ time. A corpus of fund to finance the building was created with a sum of one lakh and fourteen thousand rupees, quite a handsome amount by the standards of the time. People from all walks of life contributed to the fund. A measure of people's urge for making a success of the college can be had from the fact that the common man's small donations, of one or two rupees each, added up to quite a significant portion of the corpus. The institution has developed a distinctive identity of its own in the southern fringes of the city. It has been absolutely unrelenting in its efforts to reach out to the students of the area, especially the ones coming from the economically vulnerable sections of the society.

== Departments and courses ==
The college offers different undergraduate and postgraduate courses and aims at imparting education to the undergraduates and postgraduates of upper-, lower- and middle-class people of Kolkata and its adjoining areas.

=== Arts ===
Arts faculty consists of departments of Bengali, English, Education, Economics, History, Political Science, Journalism & Mass Communication, and Geography.

== Accreditation ==
NAAC- The college was accredited by the National Assessment and Accreditation Council in 2007 and re-accredited in 2016 with a B+ grade.

RUSA-The Rashtriya Uchhatara Shiksha Abhiyan grant was also received by the college.

== See also ==
- Education in India
- Education in West Bengal
- Netaji Nagar Day College
- Netaji Nagar College for Women
- Netaji Nagar, Kolkata
- List of colleges affiliated to the University of Calcutta
