= Kannagi (newspaper) =

Indian newspaper (1948–1977)

Kannagi was a Tamil language newspaper published in Tamil Nadu, southern India. The first copy was published on the initiative of former Indian National Army officer R. Sakthi Mohan on 29 May 1952. It succeeded the publication Netaji, which had started in 1948. Soon it became the regional organ of the All India Forward Bloc in Tamil Nadu.

Kannagi identified itself as a 'Revolutionary Nationalist Forthnightly', and its motto was 'All Power to the people'. By 1957 Kannagi had a circulation of around 10 000.

In 1977 the publication of Kannagi was discontinued.
