= Netaji Subhas Chandra Bose Road =

- Road in Kolkata (Calcutta)
- Location in Kolkata
- Coordinates: 22.48348°N 88.352948°E
- Country: India
- State: West Bengal
- District: Kolkata
- City: Kolkata
- Metro Station: Masterda Surya Sen; Gitanjali

Government
  - Body: Kolkata Municipal Corporation

Netaji Subhas Chandra Bose Road is a road that runs through South Kolkata connecting Tollygunge area near Mahanayak Uttam Kumar metro station and Garia near Garia Crossing or Garia More.

The road is narrow, but carries a considerable amount of traffic throughout the day.

== Landmarks ==
- The Indrapuri Film Studios
- The ITC Sangeet Research Academy
- The Assembly of God Church School (Tollygunge branch)
- Sri Aurobindo Institute of Culture
- Swetamber Gujarati Jain Temple
- Bansdroni Supermarket
- Masterda Surya Sen metro station
- Naktala High School
- Gitanjali metro station
- Malancha Cinema
- BSNL Telephone Exchange
- The Tolly Residency
- Garia Bus Stand

== Transport ==
Several Buses ply on NSC Bose Road are:

- AC-6 (Garia 6 no Bus stand- Howrah Stn)
- S-7 (Garia 6 no Bus stand - Howrah Stn)
- 80A (Garia - Esplanade)
- 205 (Bansdroni - Babughat)
- 205A (Bansdroni - Babughat)
- 228 (Garia - Babughat)
- S-112 Mini (Naktala - Howrah Stn)
- S-113 Mini (Harinavi - Howrah Stn)
- 41 (Layelka - Howrah Stn)
- 41B (Netaji Nagar - Howrah Stn)
- SD 5 (Khariberia - Sonarpur Stn)
