= Netaji (magazine) =

Tamil magazine

Netaji was a Tamil language weekly magazine published by the All India Forward Bloc in Tamil Nadu. The first copy was released on 23 January 1948, the birthday of Netaji Subhas Chandra Bose. The founder was Muthuramalinga Thevar.

== Sources ==
- Bose, K.; Forward Bloc. Madras: 1988, Tamil Nadu Academy of Political Science. p. 168.
