= Bansdroni =

Bansdroni Bengali: বাঁশদ্রোণী
- Neighbourhood in Kolkata (Calcutta)
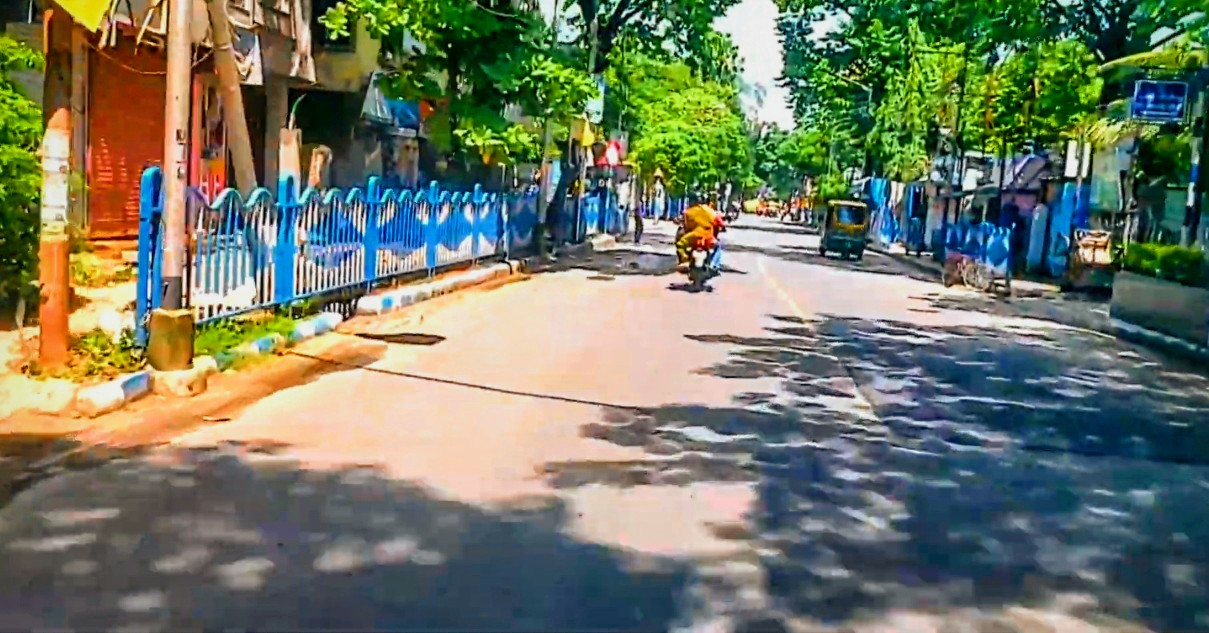
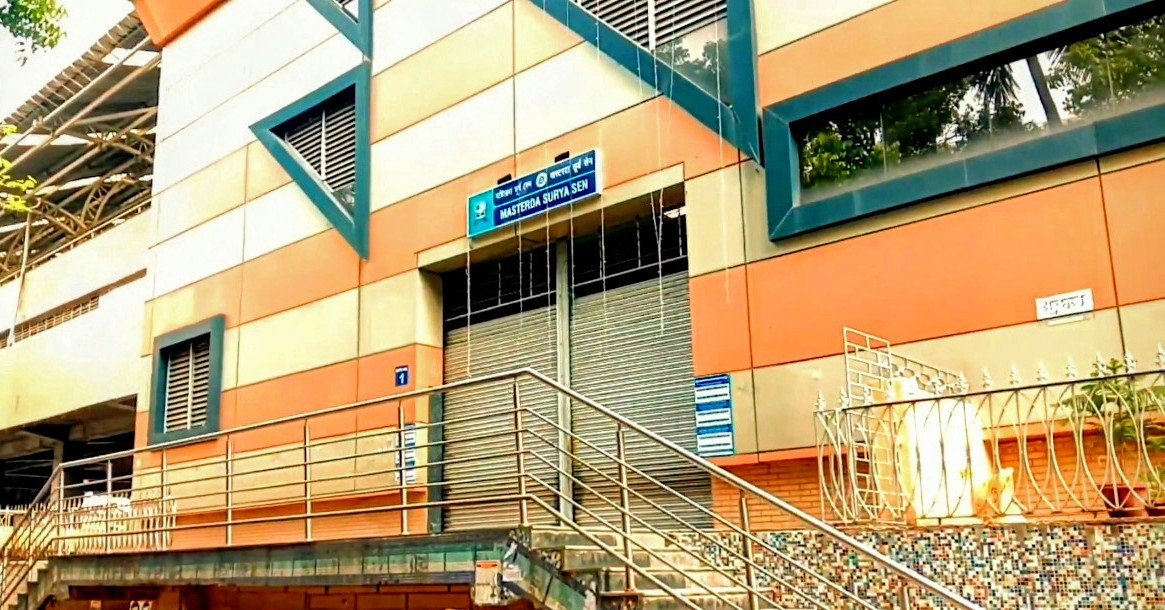
- 1:Bansdroni, N.S.C Bose Road 2:Master Da Surya Sen Metro Station

- Location in Kolkata
- Coordinates: 22.4708°N 88.3618°E
- Country: India
- State: West Bengal
- City: Kolkata
- District: Kolkata
- Metro Station: Masterda Surya Sen
- Municipal Corporation: Kolkata Municipal Corporation
- KMC wards: 98, 112, 113
- Elevation: 36 ft (11 m)

Population
  - Total: For population see linked KMC pages
- Time zone: UTC+5:30 (IST)
- PIN: 700047, 700070
- Area code: +91 33
- Lok Sabha constituency: Jadavpur
- Vidhan Sabha constituency: Tollyganj

Bansdroni is a locality of South Kolkata in West Bengal, India. It is a part of Tollygunge area.

== History ==
Bandsroni used to be a port during the 17th century when the Adi Ganga was the main flow of the Ganges into the Bay of Bengal. It was the gateway to a large hinterland in South 24 Parganas. Bansdroni takes its name from 'Bangsho Dron', meaning "bamboo forest".

== Geography ==
=== Police district ===
The Bandsroni police station is in the South Suburban division of Kolkata Police. It is located at Rainagar health centre, Madhyapara, Bansdroni, Kolkata-700070.

Patuli Women police station has jurisdiction over all police districts under the jurisdiction of South Suburban Division i.e. Netaji Nagar, Jadavpur, Kasba, Regent Park, Bansdroni, Garfa and Patuli.

Jadavpur, Thakurpukur, Behala, Purba Jadavpur, Tiljala, Regent Park, Metiabruz, Nadial and Kasba police stations were transferred from South 24 Parganas to Kolkata in 2011. Except for Metiabruz, all the police stations were split into two. The new police stations are Parnasree, Haridevpur, Garfa, Patuli, Survey Park, Pragati Maidan, Bansdroni and Rajabagan.

=== Location ===
It is in a residential area, with nearly every building a residential one. This area verges the Bansdroni & Netaji Nagar Police Stations. Subhash Park, Rifle Club, Jaysree, Dinesh Palli, Congress Nagar, Ananda Pally (East), Subodh Garden, Postal Park, Beltala Road (Postal Park), Chirantani Park, Arobindo park, Rania are important localities. Reputable fresh vegetables, fruits and fish markets (bazaars) are also found here.

=== Nearby ===
Bansdroni is close to Garia, Naktala, Ranikuthi, and Tollygunge, all on the main Netaji Subhash Chandra Bose Road.

== Transport ==
The place is connected to the city with the Netaji Subhash Chandra Bose Road, linking Naktala and Garia in the south-east and Tollygunge in the south-west. The Kolkata Metro allows transport to and from Bansdroni at the Masterda Surya Sen metro station. Bus services in Bandsroni include AC Bus (AC6), CSTC Buses (S6A, S7), Private Buses (80A, 205, 205A, 228, SD5), Naktala — Howrah Mini Bus, and Harinavi -Howrah Mini Bus.

== Education ==
Education is provided by schools such as The Assembly of God Church School (Tollygunj Branch), Future Foundation, G.D. Birla, Maharishi Vidya Mandir, Holy Home, Adarsh English High School, B.D. Memorial (Primary), St. Mary's Church School and De Paul (the last two being catholic). Some of the oldest boys and girls schools include Khanpur Hirendralal Sarkar High School (Boys), Khanpur Nirmala Bala (Girls) High School, Bansdroni Binoy Balika Vidyalaya, Binoy Pally Adarsha Bidya Mandir, Chakdaha Boys & Girls HS Schools, Little Memorial School (Nursery and Primary School BANSDRONI and NAKTALA) are also situated in the Bansdroni Park/Postal Park Area.

== Cultural/Visual and Performing Arts Institutions ==
Bansdroni has several cultural institutes of visual and performing arts. One of them is Mermaid Film Academy, a two-time national-award-winning dance school located in the area, which also organises an annual cultural dance event.

== Notable people ==
The Indian actor Shri Chhabi Biswas used to reside in Bansdroni. He was primarily known for his performances in movies such as Tapan Sinha's Kabuliwala and Satyajit Ray's films Jalshaghar (The Music Room, 1958), Devi (The Goddess, 1960), and Kanchenjungha (1962).
