= Shahid Khudiram metro station =

Metro terminus in Kolkata, India

Shahid Khudiram
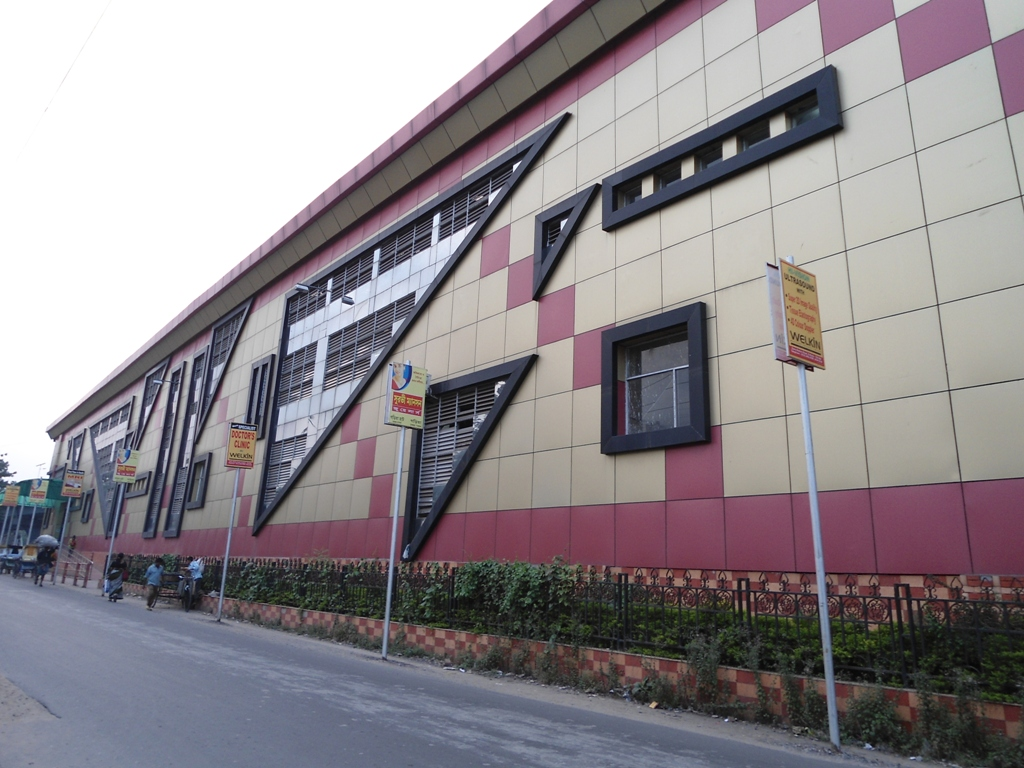
- Shahid Khudiram metro station

General information
- Location: Garia Station Road, Garia; Kolkata, West Bengal 700084; India
- Coordinates: 22.46621°N 88.39153°E
- System: Kolkata Metro
- Operator: Metro Railway, Kolkata
- Line: Blue Line
- Platforms: 2 (2 Side platform)

Construction
- Structure type: Elevated
- Accessible: Yes

Other information
- Station code: KSKD

History
- Opened: 7 October 2010; 15 years ago
- Former names: Briji

Services
Preceding station	Kolkata Metro	Following station
Kavi Nazrul towards Dakshineswar	Blue Line	Terminus
Route map
Location

Shahid Khudiram is an elevated metro station on the North-South corridor of the Blue Line of Kolkata Metro in Briji, Garia, Kolkata, West Bengal, India. This station is named in honour of the Bengali revolutionary Khudiram Bose. This structure is located above the drainage channel between Pranabananda Road and Garia Station Road at the west side of the Eastern Metropolitan Bypass. Due to reconstruction of Blue line's station complex at Kavi Subhash, a majority of trains on this line currently originate/terminate at this station on a temporary basis.

== Station layout ==
L2	Side platform, Doors will open on the left
L2	Platform 2	Alighting only →
L2	Platform 1	← Train towards Dakshineswar (Kavi Nazrul)
L2	Side platform, Doors will open on the left
L1	Concourse	Fare control, station agent, Metro QR ticket vending machines, crossover
G	Street level	Exit/Entrance

=== Facilities ===
ATM is available here.

== Connections ==
=== Bus ===
Services on routes 45A, 45B, AS-3, S-9C, S-24, S-112 (Mini), C-26 and Garia Station - Baghbazar are available from the station.

=== Train ===
Garia railway station of Indian Railways is situated nearby.

== Entry/Exit ==
- 1 - Garia Station, Remedy Hospital
- 2 - Panchasayar, EM Bypass

== See also ==
- Kolkata
- List of Kolkata Metro stations
- Transport in Kolkata
- Kolkata Metro Rail Corporation
- Kolkata Suburban Railway
- Kolkata Monorail
- Trams in Kolkata
- Garia
- E.M. Bypass
- List of rapid transit systems
- List of metro systems
