= Baishnabghata Patuli Township =

Baishnabghata Patuli Township Patuli
- Neighbourhood in Kolkata (Calcutta)
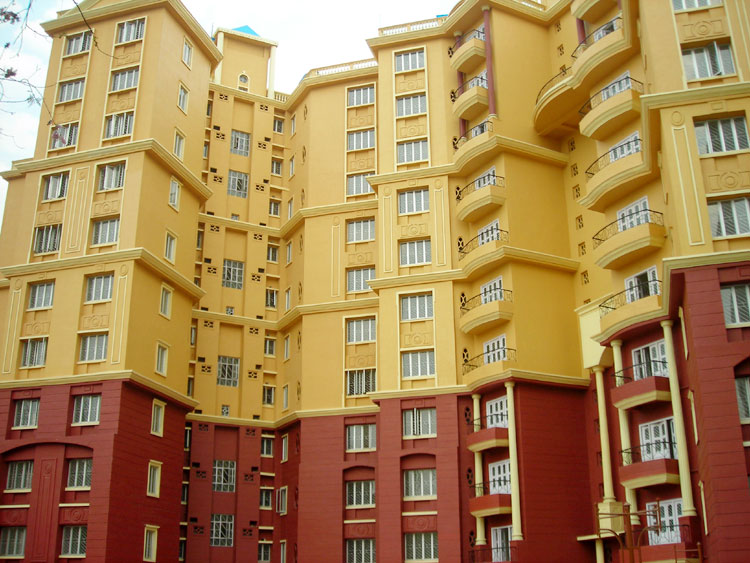
- Ashabari Housing Complex

- Location in Kolkata
- Coordinates: 22°28′20″N 88°23′16″E
- Country: India
- State: West Bengal
- District: South 24 Parganas
- City: Kolkata
- Metro Station: Kavi Nazrul, Shahid Khudiram and Kavi Subhash
- KMC Ward: 101, 110

Languages
  - Official: Bengali, English
- Time zone: UTC+5:30 (IST)
- PIN: 700084, 700094
- Telephone code: 033
- Lok Sabha constituency: Jadavpur
- Vidhan Sabha constituency: Jadavpur

Baishnabghata Patuli Township is a locality of South Kolkata in West Bengal, India . It constitutes a major portion of Garia. It is a World Bank–funded project on the eastern fringes of EM Bypass, currently one of the most promising area of East Kolkata. The Township is divided into a number of designated Blocks, extending both side of the busy by pass connector.

== Geography ==
=== Physical ===
The area lies on Gangetic Basin and in fact borders an earlier course of a distributary of the River Ganges (গঙ্গা) known as 'Adi Ganga' (আদি গঙ্গা lit. meaning Old Ganges). The areas are mostly wetlands in nature that has been urbanized. The area is diverse that houses a variety species of flora and fauna. Especially variety of Avian species are viewed here round the year. Presence of big lakes house variety species of fishes even.

=== Geology ===
The soil here is of Clayey and Alluvial nature. Soil is very fertile and so house a variety species of flora. Average mean sea level is 17 feet.

=== Police district ===
Patuli police station is in the South Suburban division of Kolkata Police. It is located at H-10 Baishnabghata-Patuli Township, PO Panchasayar, Kolkata-700094.

Patuli Women police station, at the same address, has jurisdiction over all police districts under the jurisdiction of South Suburban Division i.e. Netaji Nagar, Jadavpur, Kasba, Regent Park, Bansdroni, Garfa and Patuli.

Jadavpur, Thakurpukur, Behala, Purba Jadavpur, Tiljala, Regent Park, Metiabruz, Nadial and Kasba police stations were transferred from South 24 Parganas to Kolkata in 2011. Except Metiabruz, all the police stations were split into two. The new police stations are Parnasree, Haridevpur, Garfa, Patuli, Survey Park, Pragati Maidan, Bansdroni and Rajabagan.

== Culture and entertainment ==
Patuli has restaurants and a variety of shops. A popular choice for outsiders is the Metropolis Mall nearby which is a shopping mall housing a lot of different variety of shops at a single location. Also Garia market is a popular destination for shopping being adjacent to the area and also for its variety and affordable shops all available at same spot.

There are many multi-cuisine restaurants in Baishnabghata Patuli Township, including Chinese, Indian, Bengali, western, confectionery and food stands. The most famous are Machranga, Posto, Sholoana Bangaliyana, Chowman, Red Bamboo Shoot, Koshe Kosha and many more.

There are many pet shops in the area - the most popular ones are Pet Famili Shop and Pet n Plants.

A floating market of Kolkata opened at Patuli in 2018 and is the first artificial floating market of India with 280 shops housing on 114 boats.
