= Dakshineswar metro station =

Metro terminus in North 24 Parganas, WB, India

Dakshineswar
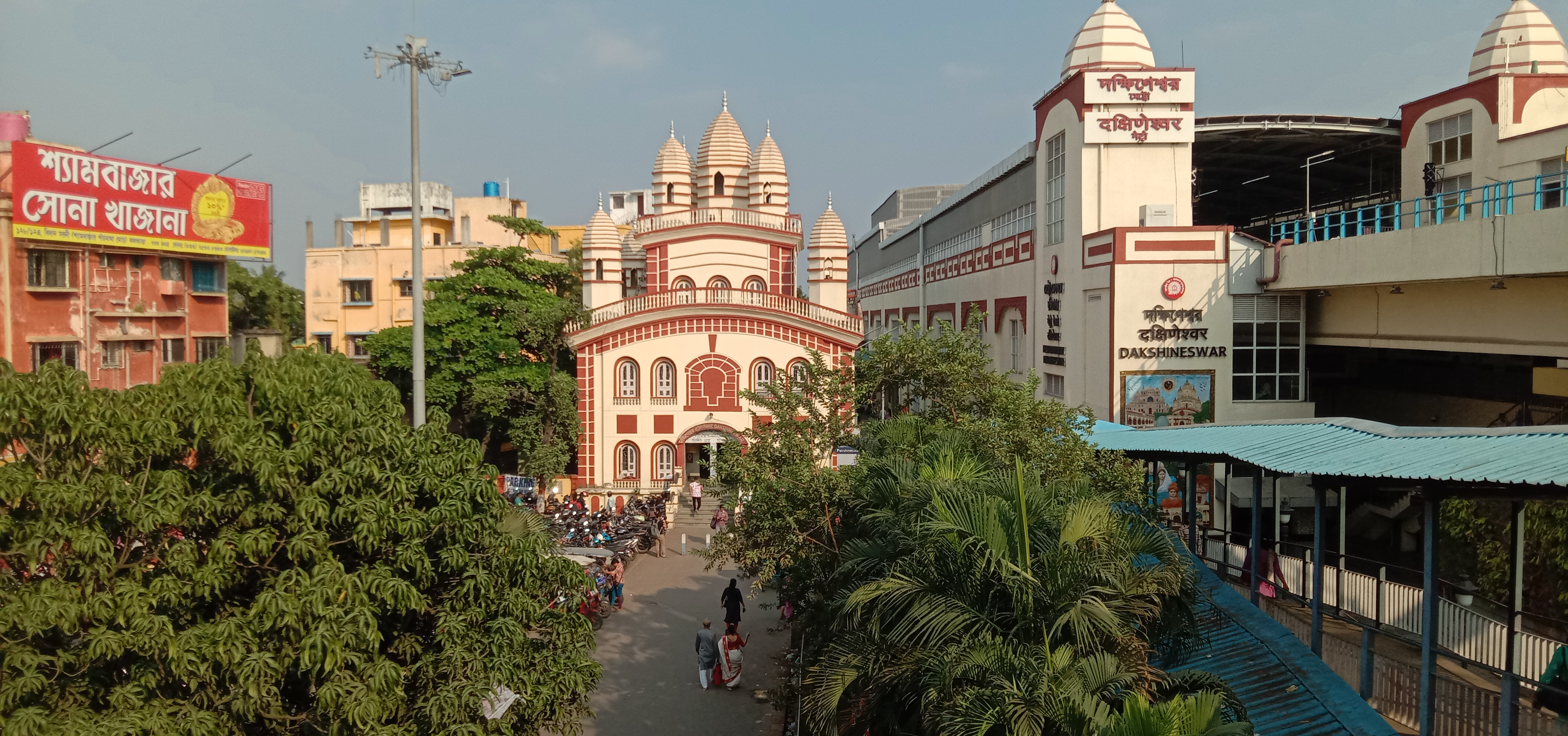
- Dakshineswar Railway Station (in middle) building built as a replica of the iconic Dakshineswar Temple, and the Dakshineswar metro station (in right).

General information
- Location: SH2, Dunlop, Baranagar, Kolkata, West Bengal 700076; India
- Coordinates: 22.65397°N 88.36372°E
- System: Kolkata Metro
- Operator: Metro Railway, Kolkata
- Line: Blue Line
- Platforms: 2 (2 side platforms)
- Tracks: 2
- Connections: Dakshineswar Bus Terminal; Ma Bhabotarini; Dakshineswar: Chord link

Construction
- Structure type: Elevated
- Parking: Yes
- Accessible: Yes
- Architect: H K Barjatya

Other information
- Status: Operational
- Station code: KDSW

History
- Opened: 22 February 2021; 5 years ago

Services
| Preceding station | Kolkata Metro | Following station |
|---|---|---|
| Terminus | Blue Line | Baranagar towards Shahid Khudiram |
Route map
Location

Dakshineswar is the elevated northern terminal metro station on the North-South corridor of the Blue Line of Kolkata Metro in Kolkata, West Bengal, India. The metro station adjoins the platforms of the Dakshineswar railway station where connections can be made with Indian Railways services. The station is located at the Dakshineswar area which is famous for Dakshineswar Kali Temple. The station was inaugurated on 22 February 2021.

== History ==
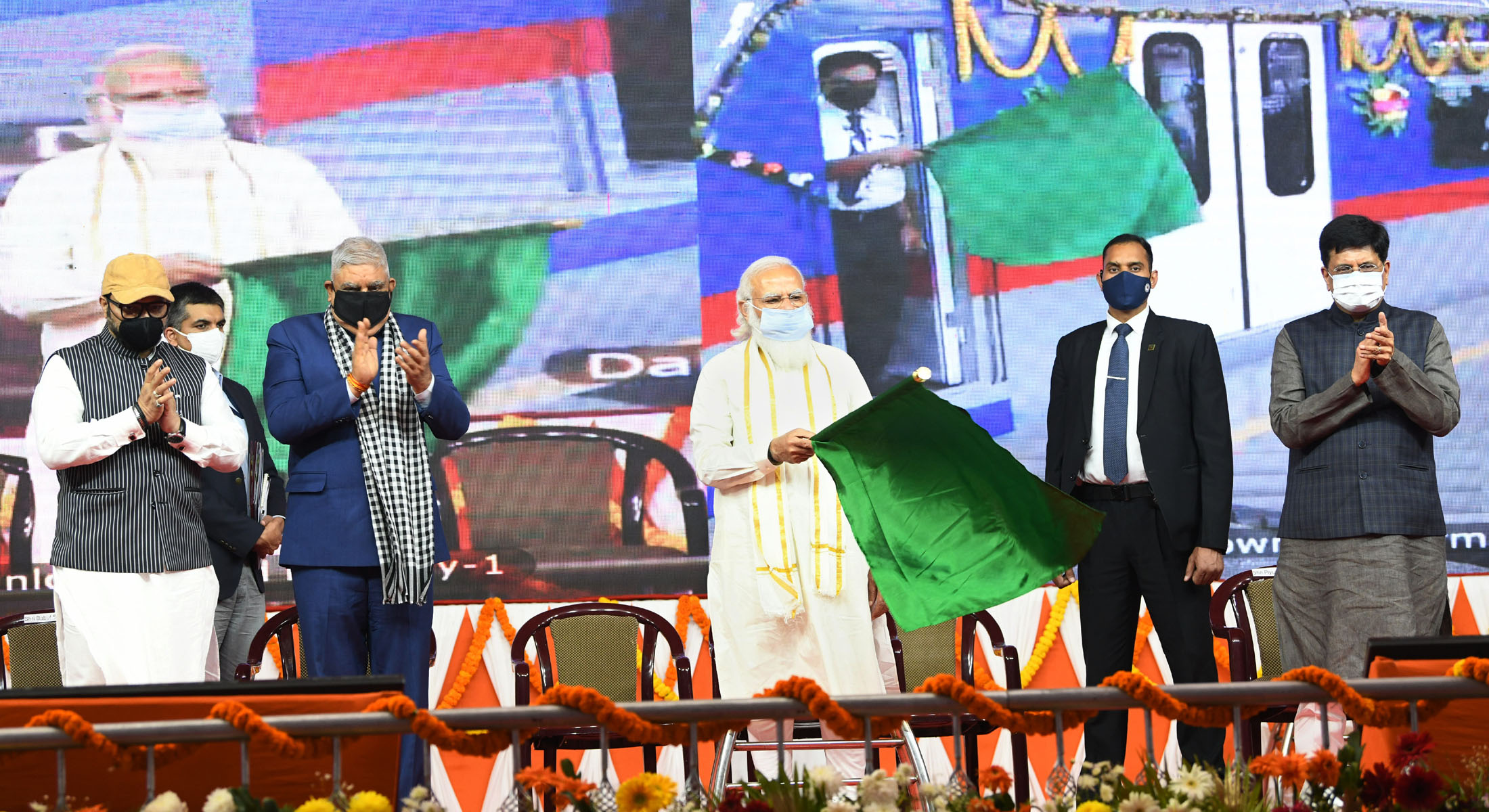
Prime Minister Narendra Modi inaugurating the Noapara—Dakshineswar metro line on February 22, 2021.

A northward extension from Dum Dum to Dakshineswar (6.20 km [3.85 mi]) was sanctioned and included in the 2010–11 budget at a cost of ₹227.53 crore (equivalent to ₹411 crore or US$58 million in 2019). Construction for the station and the section started in 2017. In December 2017, the metro line to the Dakshineswar station was projected to be operational by May 2019. By June 2019, over 95 percent of the viaduct had been completed for the between Noapara and Dakshineswar and that work had begun on the signaling system and laying of the tracks. Trial runs for this stretch started on 23 December 2020, after delay due to COVID-19 pandemic. The station was inaugurated on 22 February 2021 by Prime Minister Narendra Modi.

== Location ==
The station is located in Dakshineswar, North 24 Parganas, on PWD Road (Sitaramdas Omkarnath Sarani) and Ramakrishna Paramahansa Deb Road Crossing. The Station is situated around 300 metres away towards East from Bhabatarini Kali Temple.

== Station layout ==
| L2 | Side platform, Doors will open on the left |
| L2 | Platform 2 | Towards Shahid Khudiram (Baranagar) → |
| L2 | Platform 1 | ← Alighting only |
| L2 | Side platform, Doors will open on the left |
| L1 | Concourse | Fare control, station agent, Metro QR ticket vending machines, crossover |
| G | Street level | Exit/Entrance |

== Connections ==
=== Rail ===
It is directly connected with Dakshineswar railway station, a station on Calcutta chord link.

=== Ferry ===
The station is connected to ferry also through Ma Bhabotarini Jetty Ghat, which is around 350 metres away from the station. Ferry routes towards Uttarpara, Belur Math, Bagbazar, Howrah, Shipping Corporation Ghat (near Millennium Park) and Chandpal Ghat are available.

== Proposed Expansion ==
Metro Railway plans to extend the platform and viaduct of Dakshineswar metro station by ~90 m (300 ft) via erection of two new pillars beyond the current length to facilitate a crossover so the trains can switch tracks in order to increase the frequency of services to the Noapara-Dakshineswar stretch.

== See also ==
- List of Kolkata Metro stations
- Medical College & Hospital, Kolkata
