= Kolkata Monorail =

Rail-based transit project planned for Kolkata, West Bengal, India

Overview
- Locale: Kolkata Metropolitan Area
- Transit type: Straddle-beam Monorail

Kolkata Monorail was a rail-based transit project planned for the city of Kolkata, West Bengal, India. This was the first proposed monorail in the country.

== History ==
=== 2004 & 2008 ===
The initial plan regarding the monorail was floated in 2004. In November that 2008, the first corridor (Budge Budge to Taratala) was finalised and the project was awarded to Andromeda Technologies, at a total cost of Rs. 1,200 crore, along with a German company, Derap AG & Helbling Technik AG and Fernmeldewerk Munchen Aubing, as technology and signalling partners, respectively. It was a build-own-operate public-private partnership model between Government of West Bengal and Andromeda Technologies Pvt. Ltd. The coaches were supposed to be initially imported from Germany, and later locally produced at Titagarh Wagons, Jessop and Texmaco. It was targeted that the phase 1 corridor would be operational by the next 4–5 years. The 2nd phase was a 52 km long route from Taratala to Rajarhat. But, the project was put on hold, due to lack of support from financial institution and unfavourable conditions, and Andromeda Technologies pulled out from it. The sanction of Orange Line in 2010-11 Railway Budget, led to the end of the monorail corridor, since both had almost the same alignment.

=== 2014 ===
Scomi Engineering, expressed its intention to develop monorail system in the city, especially in New Town, with a budget of Rs. 2000-2500 crore.

=== 2016 ===
In 2016, the plan was revived. A 70 km corridor from Budge Budge to Ruby on EM Bypass, via Budge Budge Trunk Road, New Alipore and Prince Anwar Shah Road, was proposed, to connect parts South 24 Parganas with the Orange Line. The state industry promotion and development board approved the proposal submitted by Burn Standard. Thus, Burn Standard was the implementation agency of the project in PPP model with Government of West Bengal, at a cost of Rs. 4,216 crore. The Physical construction was planned to begin by March 2017 with a 3-year deadline. The project again came to a halt after few years.

=== 2018 ===
West Bengal Housing & Infrastructure Development Corporation in October 2018 proposed monorail for New Town, the fast-growing planned satellite city of Kolkata and Salt Lake, another planned city adjacent to New Town. The feasibility study was conducted and cost evaluation of the project was done. The line would start at Ultandanga, and pass via Salt Lake Sector I & III and would end at New Town, thus connecting Green Line and Orange Line. The total cost of project was estimated at Rs. 4500 crore.

== Current status ==
Again in 2020, Braithwaite & Co., started talks with Government of West Bengal to set up monorail in the state. It is planned to run between Sealdah and Titagarh. The corridor is still in planning stage. In February 2020, New Town Kolkata Development Authority (NKDA) shelved the monorail proposal in and around New Town, and preferred to opt for a cheaper ropeway system.

== Corridors ==
Year	2006		2014	2016	2018	2020
Phase	1	2	2014	2016	2018	2020
Corridor	Budge Budge – Taratala	Taratala – Rajarhat	NewTown	Budge Budge – Ruby	Ultadanga – New Town	Sealdah – Titagarh
Length	20 kilometres (12 mi)	52 kilometres (32 mi)	00 kilometres (0 mi)	70 kilometres (43 mi)	13 kilometres (8.1 mi)	20 kilometres (12 mi)
Status	Proposed	Scrapped	Scrapped	Proposed	Scrapped	Proposed

: Approximate Length

== See also ==
- Kolkata Metro
- Kolkata Suburban Railway
- Kolkata Light Rail Transit
- Trams in Kolkata
