= Garia =

Neighbourhood of Kolkata, India

- Neighbourhood in Kolkata (Calcutta)
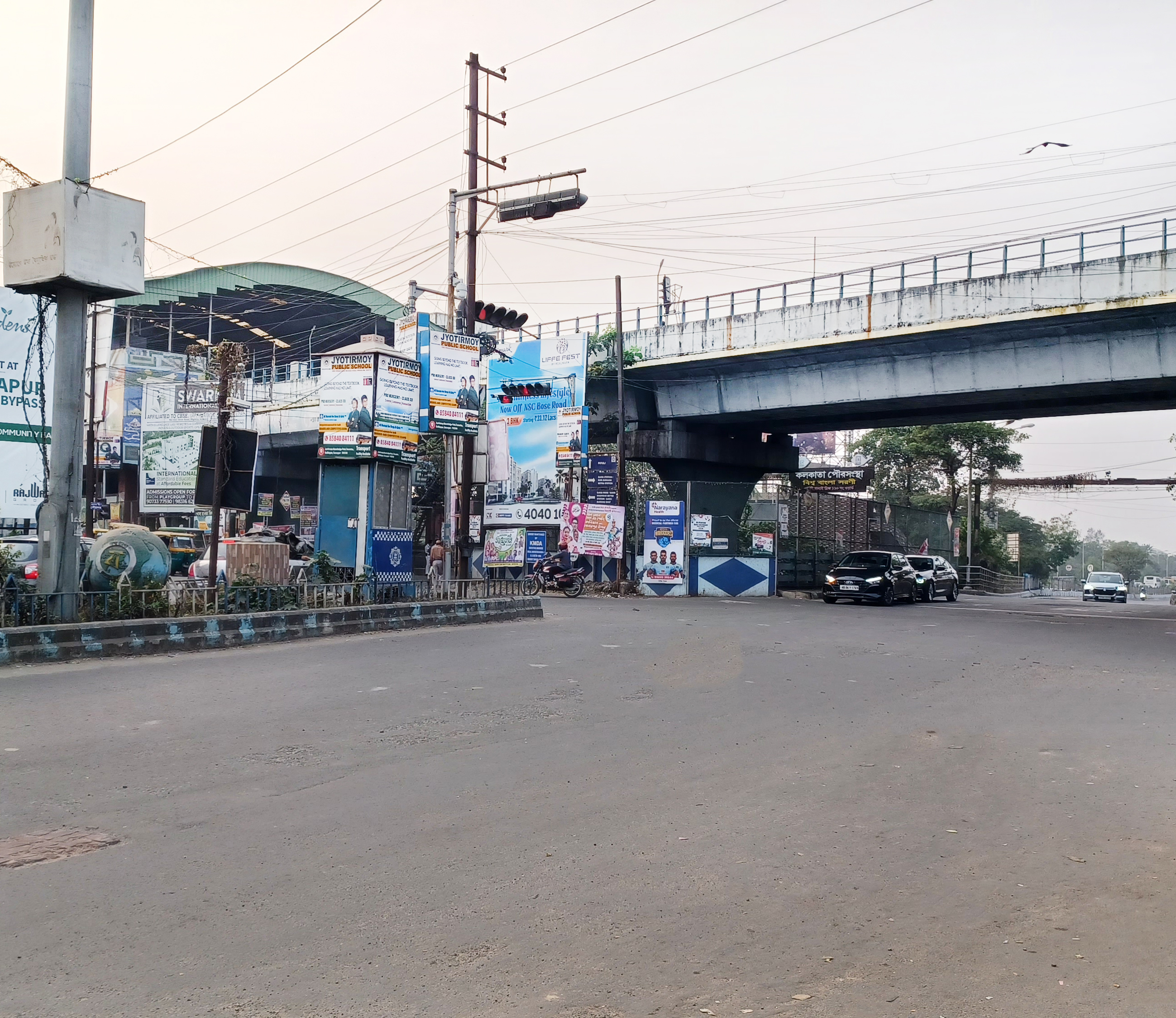
- Garia station Rd

- Location in Kolkata
- Coordinates: 22.4629°N 88.3968°E
- Country: India
- State: West Bengal
- City: Kolkata
- District: South 24 Parganas
- Metro Station: Gitanjali; Kavi Nazrul; Shahid Khudiram; Kavi Subhash
- Municipal Corporation: Kolkata Municipal Corporation; Rajpur Sonarpur Municipality
- KMC wards: 100, 101, 109, 110, 111
- Time zone: UTC+5:30 (IST)
- PIN: 700084, 700047, 700094, 700152
- Area code: +91 33
- Lok Sabha constituency: Jadavpur
- Vidhan Sabha constituency: Jadavpur and Sonarpur Uttar

Garia is a neighbourhood of South Kolkata in the South 24 Parganas district in the Indian state of West Bengal. It is bordered by the neighbourhoods of Jadavpur in the north, Bansdroni/Tollygunge in the north-west, Santoshpur/Mukundapur in the north-east and Narendrapur/Rajpur Sonarpur in the south. It is on the banks of Adi Ganga.

== Geographic location ==
The junction of Raja S.C.Mullick Road, N.S.C. Bose Road and Garia Main Road adjacent to Kanungo Park is known as "Garia More".

== Shopping ==
Garia is one of the major shopping areas of Kolkata. Notable shopping malls and department stores include:

- Metropolis Mall, Hiland Park, EM Bypass, Chak Garia
- Smart Bazaar, Orbit Mall, Garia
- Spencer's, Garia Station Road
- Spencer's Express, Baishnabghata Patuli Township
- Spencer's Express, Tolly Heights, Naktala
- Proyozonio
- Bizarre Bazar
- Sonar Bangla Shopping Complex
- Pooja Plaza (Near Garia Bazaar)
- Parnashree Market (Near Garia Main Road)
- New Raghunath Market
- Brand Factory (Near Mahamayatala, Garia)
- Bazaar Kolkata (Mahamayatala, Garia)

== Medical facilities ==
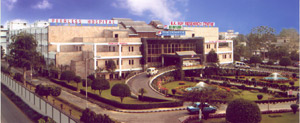
Peerless Hospital

Several medical institutes are found within Garia.

- The Apollo Clinic
- Bengal Rural Welfare Service (BRWS) Hospital
- Banchbo Healing Touch
- Peerless Hospital (Panchasayar)
- Remedy Hospital (Kalitala)
- Lifeline Hospital (Pratapgarh)
- Namita Biswas Memorial Eye Hospital (Garia Station)
- Sevangan Nursing Home
- Smilz Dental Treatment Facility (Garia Park)
- Remedy Diagnostic Center
- Medich Health Clinic and Diagnostic Centre
- Friends Diagnostic Private Limited
- Mother Teresa Memorial TB Hospital and Research Centre
- Neotia Mediplus Super Specialty Clinic (part of Park Hospitals), 168 Garia Main Road, Kolkata 700084 (Opp. 228 bus stand)

== Education ==
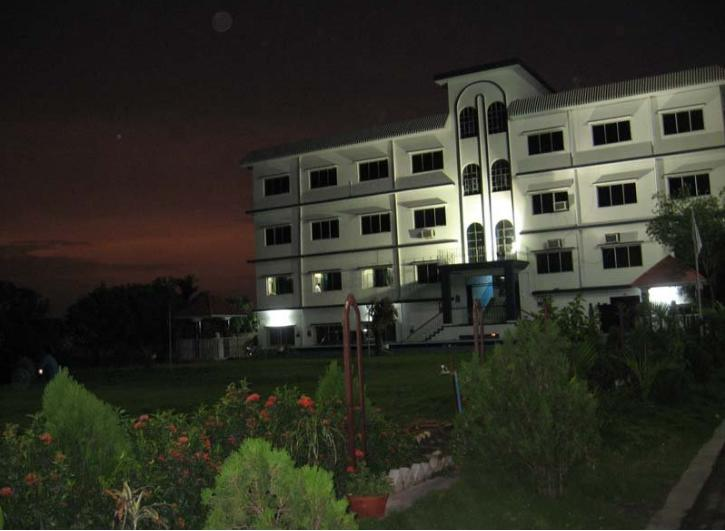
Netaji Subhash Engineering College

Garia is home to several academic, research and professional institutions. Major colleges, schools and research institutions located here include:

- Netaji Subhash Engineering College
- Indian Centre for Space Physics, Garia Station Road
- Dinabandhu Andrews College-affiliated to Calcutta University.
- Satyajit Ray Film and Television Institute
- Centre for Studies in Social Sciences, Calcutta
- Seacom Marine College
- National Institute of Hotel Management, Kolkata
- Sammilani Mahavidyalaya
- K.K. Das College
- Future Institute of Engineering and Management
- Swami Vivekananda Institute of Science and Technology
- Neotia Academy Of Nursing, Chak Garia
- Indus Valley World School
- Welland Gouldsmith School
- Techno India Group Public School
- Techno Model School
- Miranda High School
- B.D. Memorial Institute-Mahamayatala
- Garia Baroda Prasad High School
- Garia Harimati Devi U. Balika School
- Garia Vidyabhavana South School
- Kids World School
- Ideal commercial College
- Garia Madrasah Badrul Uloom Quraniya - Islamic Educational Institute
- Balia Nafar Chandra Balika Vidyalaya
- Tentulberia Anukul Chandra High School
- Holy Home School, Usha

== In popular culture ==
In early 1953, the principal photography of Satyajit Ray's debut film Pather Panchali was done at Boral, which was then a small village on the outskirts of Kolkata and is now a locality of Garia. A decade later, Ray again shot a scene of Goopy Gyne Bagha Byne in the dense bamboo groves near a pond in Garia.

== Notable Resident ==
- Ashapurna Devi, novelist and poet
- Anurag Basu, film director
- Kaushik Ganguly, film director
- Churni Ganguly, actress
- Locket Chatterjee, actress
- Sayak Chakraborty, television actor
- Pabitra Sarkar, Former Vice chancellor, Writer and Critics

== Transport ==
Garia has two bus terminals named Garia 6 no. Nagarik Bus Terminus and Garia 5 no. Bus Terminus. A variety of AC & Non-AC Buses depart from this terminus.

=== Bus ===
WBTC

- AC-6 (Garia 6 no Bus stand - Howrah Stn)
- AC-37 (Garia 6 no Bus stand - Barasat)
- AC-37C (Garia 6 no Bus stand - Airport)
- AC-37A (Garia 6 no Bus stand - Airport)
- AC-50A (Garia 6 no Bus stand - Rajchandrapur)
- AC-5 (Garia 5 no Bus stand - Howrah Stn)
- S-5 (Garia 5 no Bus stand - Howrah Stn)
- S-7 (Garia 6 no Bus stand - Howrah Stn)
- S-21 (Garia 6 no Bus stand - Baghbazar)
- S-14 (Garia 6 no Bus stand - Karunamoyee)
- AC-24 (Patuli - Howrah Stn)
- AC-24A (Kamalgazi - Howrah Stn)
- S-9C (Kamalgazi - Ecospace)
- S-24 (Kamalgazi - Howrah Stn)
- AC-14 (Baruipur - Karunamoyee

Garia also features the last three stations of the Kolkata Metro Railway's Blue Line (North-South Corridor). These are, from north to south:

- Kavi Nazrul (Garia Bazaar)
- Shahid Khudiram (Briji Area)
- Kavi Subhas (New Garia)

The Kavi Subhas station is the southern terminus of the Blue Line. It also serves as an interchange station for the Orange Line (Bypass Corridor).

== See also ==
- New Garia
- Kolkata Metro Railway Routes (North South Corridor)
- Kolkata Suburban Railway
- Eastern Metropolitan Bypass
