= Church of the Lord Jesus, Kolkata =

Catholic church in Taltala, Kolkata, India

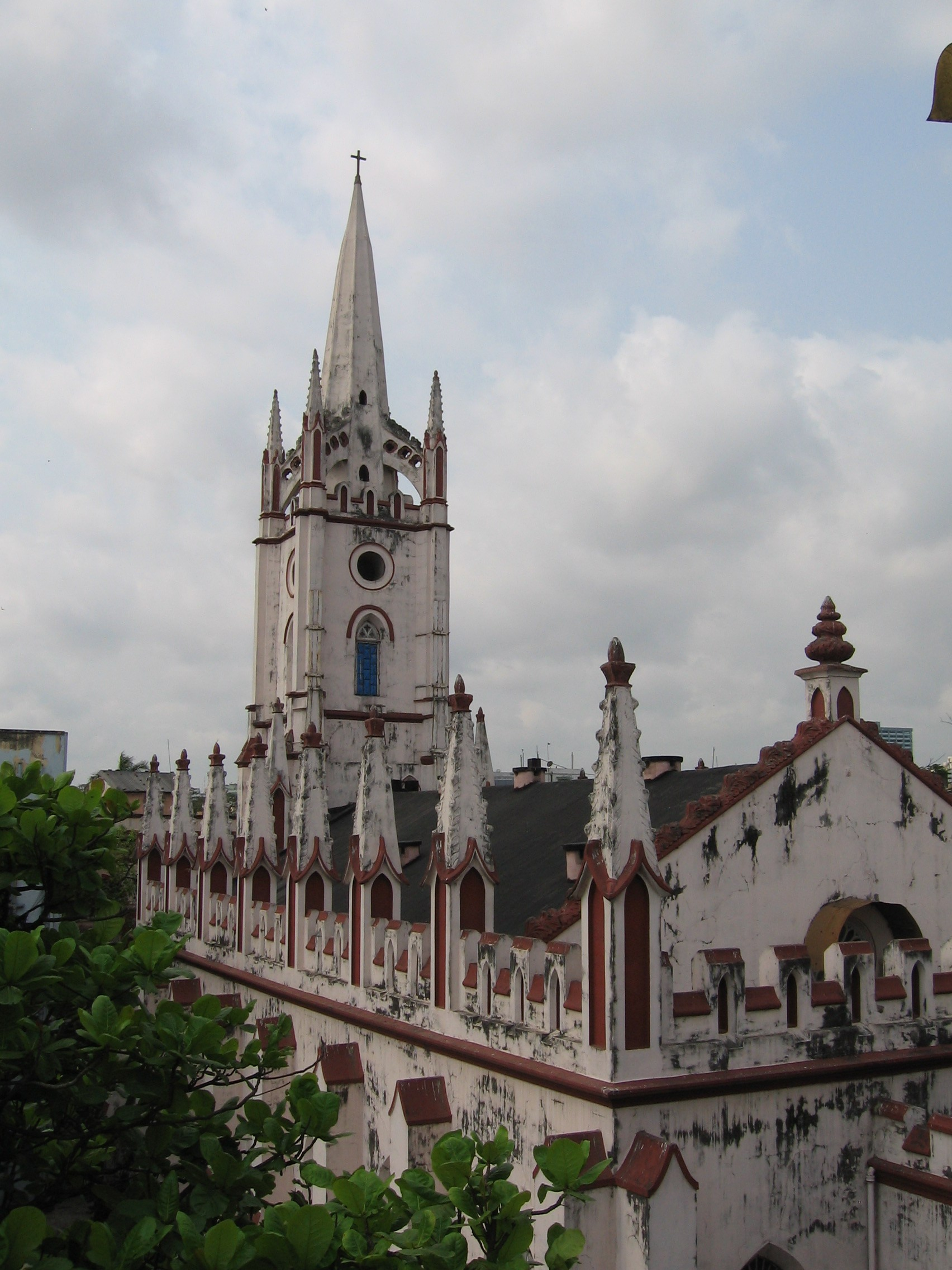
The Lord Jesus Church, in Taltala, Kolkata (Calcutta)

The Lord Jesus Church (Bengali: Prabhu Jisur Girja) is a Catholic church located at Taltala, a locality at the centre of the city of Kolkata (Calcutta) in India. Formerly a Church of Scotland Presbyterian place of worship it was handed over to the Jesuits in 1969, who made of it a centre of various apostolic activities.

== History ==
=== A Scottish Presbyterian church ===
Alexander Duff, a Presbyterian Scottish missionary, arrived in Calcutta at the beginning of the 19th century. Very active, he established the General Assembly's Institution in 1830, which is now known as the Scottish Church College.

In 1843, a serious schism divided the Church of Scotland, which had consequences even in India. The Presbyterians split into two groups and a new ‘Free Church of Scotland’ was born. In Calcutta the new ‘Free’ church built its place of worship at Wellesley Street.

The two Presbyterian churches reconciled and formed a new union in 1929, as a consequence of which the Wellesley street church lost its importance. In Calcutta, from 1942 on, the two religious congregations joined in only one, choosing the St. Andrew's Church as their place of worship.

=== A Jesuit Church ===
In 1969 the Wellesley church and attached buildings were handed over to the Jesuit fathers who gave it the Bengali name of ‘Prabhu Jisur Girja’ (Church of the Lord Jesus).

The adjacent building became the fathers’ residence and a centre of pastoral activities in the Bengali language (secretariat for liturgical translations, Christian Life Movement's office, 'Leadership training service', etc.). Over the years other pastoral works and institutions were established: a center of media and social communications, called `Chitrabani', since 1973, and a house of formation for young Jesuits, since 1981.

=== Becoming a Catholic parish ===
In 2005 the vast church, which till then was technically a ‘public oratory’ was made a parish of the Archdiocese of Calcutta, under the same title of `Prabhu Jisur Girja'. The greater part of religious services celebrated in the church are in the Bengali language.

Easter and Christmas services are held in a grand manner every year.

== See also ==
- List of Jesuit sites
