= Wellesley Gol Talab =

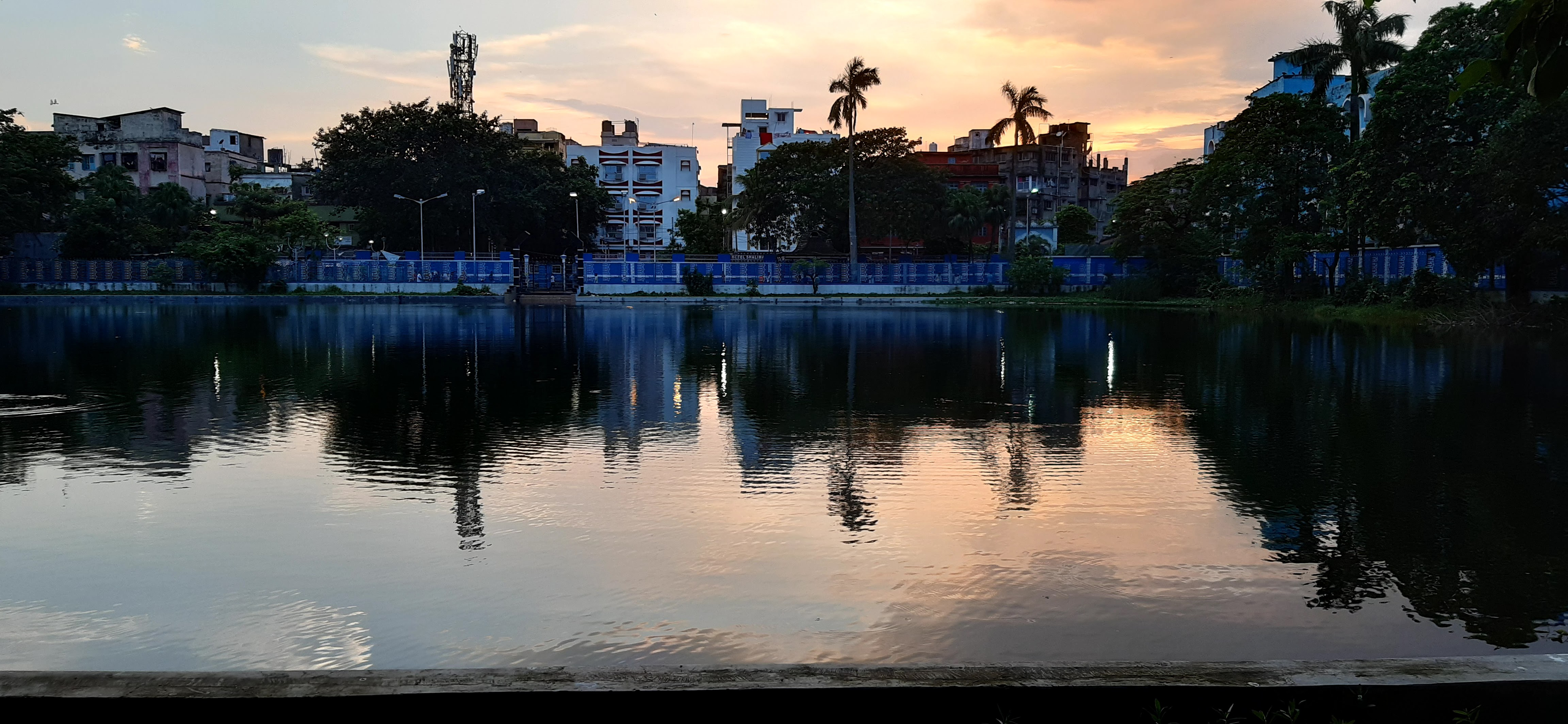
- Wellesley Gol Talab from Western End
- Interactive map of Wellesley Gol Talab
- Type: A lake and/or park
- Location: Kolkata, State of West Bengal, India
- Coordinates: 22.557208°N 88.358226°E
- Created: 18th Century
- Operator: Kolkata Municipal Corporation

Wellesley Gol Talab, (also known as Gol Talab), is a park located in Taltala neighbourhood in Central Kolkata, in the Indian state of West Bengal.

The pond is known to exist since at least early 19th century due to the fact that famous Urdu poet, Ghalib wanted to settle in the locality.

== Etymology ==
The name derives from the pond that is situated in the middle of the park, as "Gol" means "round", and "Talab" means pond in Hindi. The shape of the pond is square.

== Location ==
The park is surrounded on all sides by roads. On the western side is Rafi Ahmed Kidwai Road, southern side is Alimuddin Street, northern side is Deedar Buksh Lane and the fourth side is fenced by Haji Mohammad Mohsin Sq. road. The fourth side also has building that falls under addresses of Deedar Buksh Lane, Alimuddin Street, Waliullah Lane, and Taltalla Lane.

== See also ==
- Taltala
