= Osmond Memorial Church =

- Osmond Memorial Church
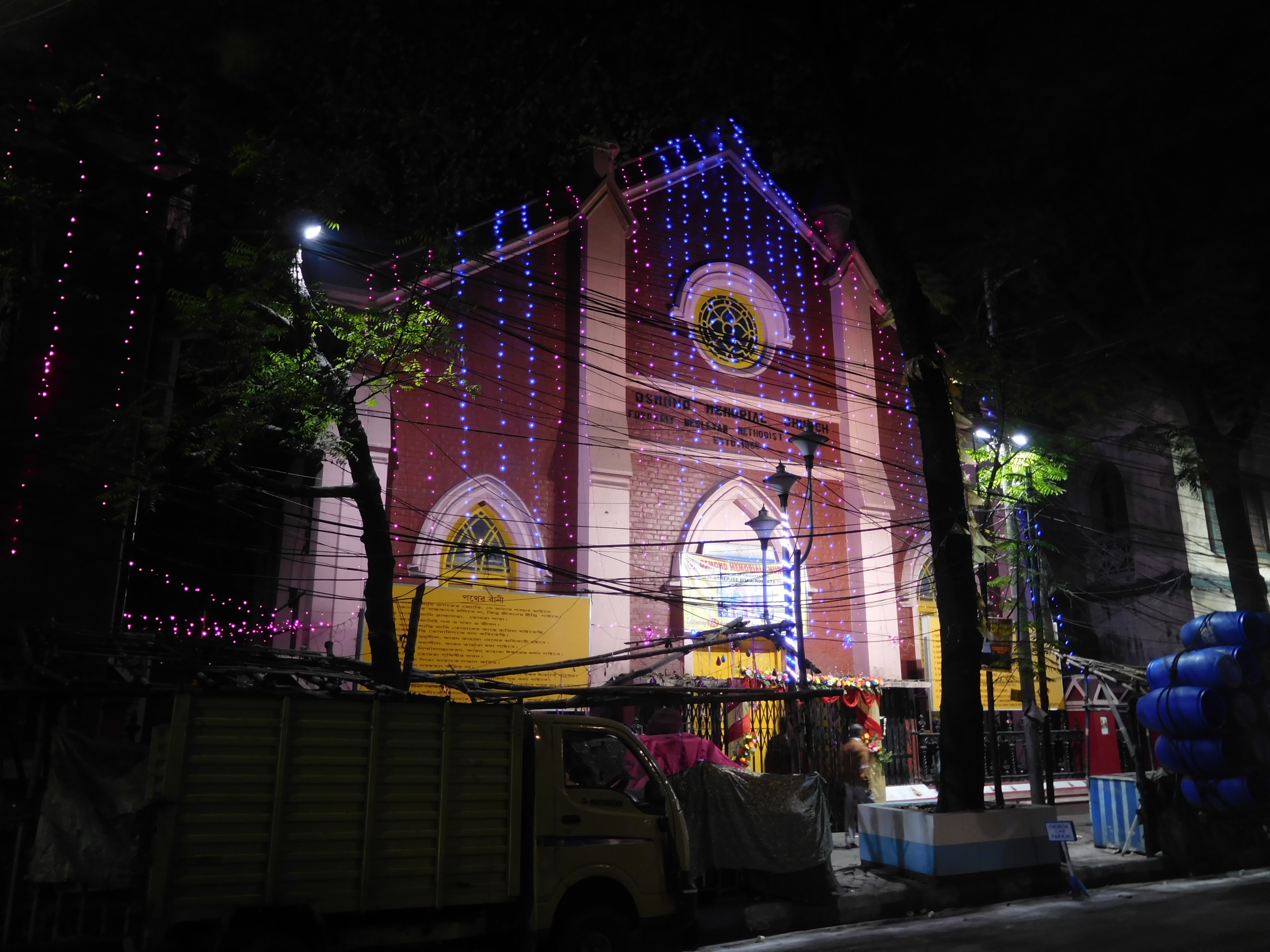
- Osmond Memorial Church
- Osmond Memorial Church
- 22.56°N 88.36°E
- Location: 56, S. N. Banerjee Road, Taltala, Kolkata
- Country: India
- Denomination: CNI
- Website: www.osmondmemorial.com

History
- Former name: Wesleyan Methodist Church
- Status: Active

Architecture
- Years built: 1868; 158 years ago

Administration
- Diocese: Calcutta Diocese

Clergy
- Bishop: The Rt. Revd. Paritosh Canning

Osmond Memorial Church, previously known as Wesleyan Methodist Church, is a historic church located at 56, S. N. Banerjee Road, Taltala, Kolkata, West Bengal, India. The Church was established by Walter Osmond in 1868.

== History ==
Walter Marsh Osmond was an Englishman, arriving in Kolkata via Dacca (now Bangladesh) in about 1864, and worked his way up to senior partner at Mackintosh, Burn & Co, a local firm of contractor, surveyors, architects and builders, before dying in 1994. At that time it was known as Wesleyan Methodist Church. Later it was named Osmond Memorial Church in the memory of the founder.

== Congregations ==
The Church has four congregations:– ~ The Bengali Congregation (at Taltala), ~ The Santhali Congregation ( at Taltala), ~ Kamardanga Chapel (at 2/2, Pottery Road) and ~ Ballygaunge Church ( at Bondel Road ).

== See also ==
- St. John's Church, Kolkata
