= Taltala =

- Neighbourhood in Kolkata (Calcutta)
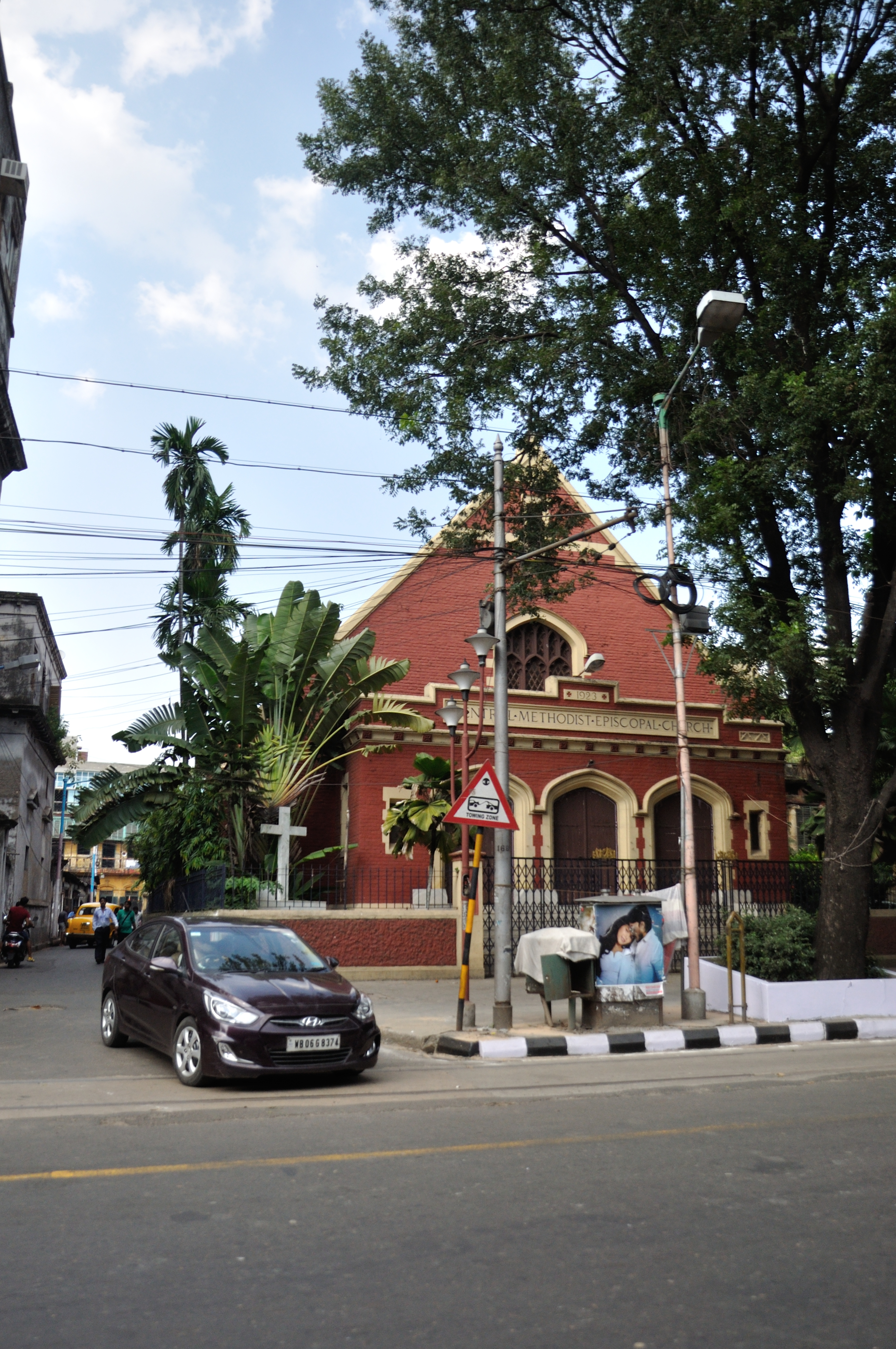
- Central Methodist Episcopal Church, Lenin Sarani, Taltala

- Location in Kolkata
- Coordinates: 22.558°N 88.359°E
- Country: India
- State: West Bengal
- City: Kolkata
- District: Kolkata
- Metro Station: Esplanade, Park Street and Sealdah
- Municipal Corporation: Kolkata Municipal Corporation
- KMC wards: 50, 51, 52, 53, 61, 62, 63
- Elevation: 36 ft (11 m)
- Time zone: UTC+5:30 (IST)
- PIN: 700014, 700016
- Area code: +91 33
- Lok Sabha constituency: Kolkata Uttar and Kolkata Dakshin
- Vidhan Sabha constituency: Chowranghee, Ballygunge and Bhabanipur

Taltala (also spelt Taltola, archaic spelling Taltollah) is a neighbourhood in Central Kolkata, in Kolkata district in the Indian state of West Bengal. One of the oldest neighbourhoods of the metropolis, it has a police station on its own name.

== Etymology ==
Taltala was named after its tal (Palmyra) trees.

== History ==
According to H. E. A. Cotton Taltala was chiefly peopled by Bihari Muslim khalasis and lascars. Wellesley Street (renamed Rafi Ahmed Kidwai Road) is described as a ‘fine broad thoroughfare’, along the course of which is situated Wellesley Square (renamed Haji Mohd. Mohsin Square). To the north of it is the Madrasa.

In 1758, one year after their decisive win in Battle of Plassey, the British East India Company commenced construction of the new Fort William in the center of the village Gobindapur. The inhabitants of the village were compensated and provided with land in Taltala, Kumortuli and Shovabazar.

Although a predominantly Muslim locality, its early Hindu settlers included Durga Charan Banerjea, father of Surendranath Banerjea. Muslims have been living in the area since the early 19th century, and the earliest inhabitants were mainly Bengali Muslims, though Bihari Muslim settlers began arriving in a flood since 1870-1880 and more so since the 1980s.

In 1888, one of the 25 newly organized police section houses was located in Taltala.

== Geography ==
=== Location ===
Ward nos 52 and 53 of Kolkata Municipal Corporation are under Taltala Police Station and part of Taltala. Small parts of ward nos 50 and 51 (only under Taltala Police Station) are part of Taltala. Ward no. 62, under both Park Street Police Station and Taltala Police Station, is also a part of Taltala. Ward no 61, under Park Street Police Station, is a part of Taltala too. A little part of ward no 63 (only under Park Street Police Station) is also a part of Taltala. The neighbourhood is bound by Bowbazar in the north, Entally in the east, Park Street neighbourhood in the south and Janbazar and Chowringhee in the west. Great celebrities of Taltala are Surendranath Banerjee, Durga Charan Banerjee, Jnanendra Nath Mukherjee, Hirendranath Mukherjee, Rezaul Karim, Dr. Moni Biswas, Dr Tamiz Khan, Narendranath Sen, Tripura sankar Sensastry, Sudam Banerjee, Nilmoni Mukherjee, Bijoy Singh Nahar, Benjamin Gomes, Syed Badruddoja and so on

=== Police district ===
Taltala police station is part of the Central division of Kolkata Police. It is located at 4, Taltala Lane, Kolkata-700014.

Taltala Women police station, located at the same address as above, covers all police districts under the jurisdiction of the Central division i.e. Bowbazar, Burrabazar, Girish Park, Hare Street, Jorasanko, Muchipara, New Market, Taltala and Posta.

== Demographics ==
Ward nos. 52 and 53 (Taltala Police Station area) of Kolkata Municipal Corporation had a total population of 43,348 in the 2001 census, of which 24,121 were males and 19,227 were females. Ward nos. 50 and 51 (Taltala Police Station Area) had population of 17,251 and 13,556 respectively. (Park Street police station area) had population of 29,704 and 24,387 respectively. Ward no. 62 (under both the Police Stations) had a population of 34,832. The locality is largely Urdu-speaking. Urdu-speaking Muslims form 85% of the population. Taltala has its own literary Bengali journal named Taltala Darpan.

== Transport ==
=== Road ===
Many buses ply along Lenin Sarani, Surendranath Banerjee Road (S.N. Banerjee Road) and Acharya Jagadish Chandra Bose Road. Few buses and Kolkata tram route no. 25 run along Rafi Ahmed Kidwai Road and Royd Street-Elliot Road in Taltala.

=== Train ===
Sealdah Station, one of the five major railway-terminals of Kolkata Metropolitan Area, is located nearby.

== Important landmarks ==
- Baker Hostel, 8 Smith Lane, established in 1910
- Taltala High School, established in 1910
- Calcutta Boys School, 72 S.N. Banerjee Road, Kolkata-14, established in 1877
- Taltala Public Library, (oldest existing public library of Calcutta established in 1882), 12B, Taltala Library Row, Calcutta - 14
- Church of the Lord Jesus on Rafi Ahmed Kidwai Road
- Osmond Memorial Church on S.N. Banerjee Road
- Central Methodist Episcopal Church on Lenin Sarani
- Taltala Police Station, the local police station
- Wellesley Gol Talab, a park surrounding a pond off Rafi Ahmed Kidwai Road
- Madrasa 'Aliya on Rafi Ahmed Kidwai Road
- Headquarters of Communist Party of India (Marxist) on Alimuddin Street

== Gallery ==
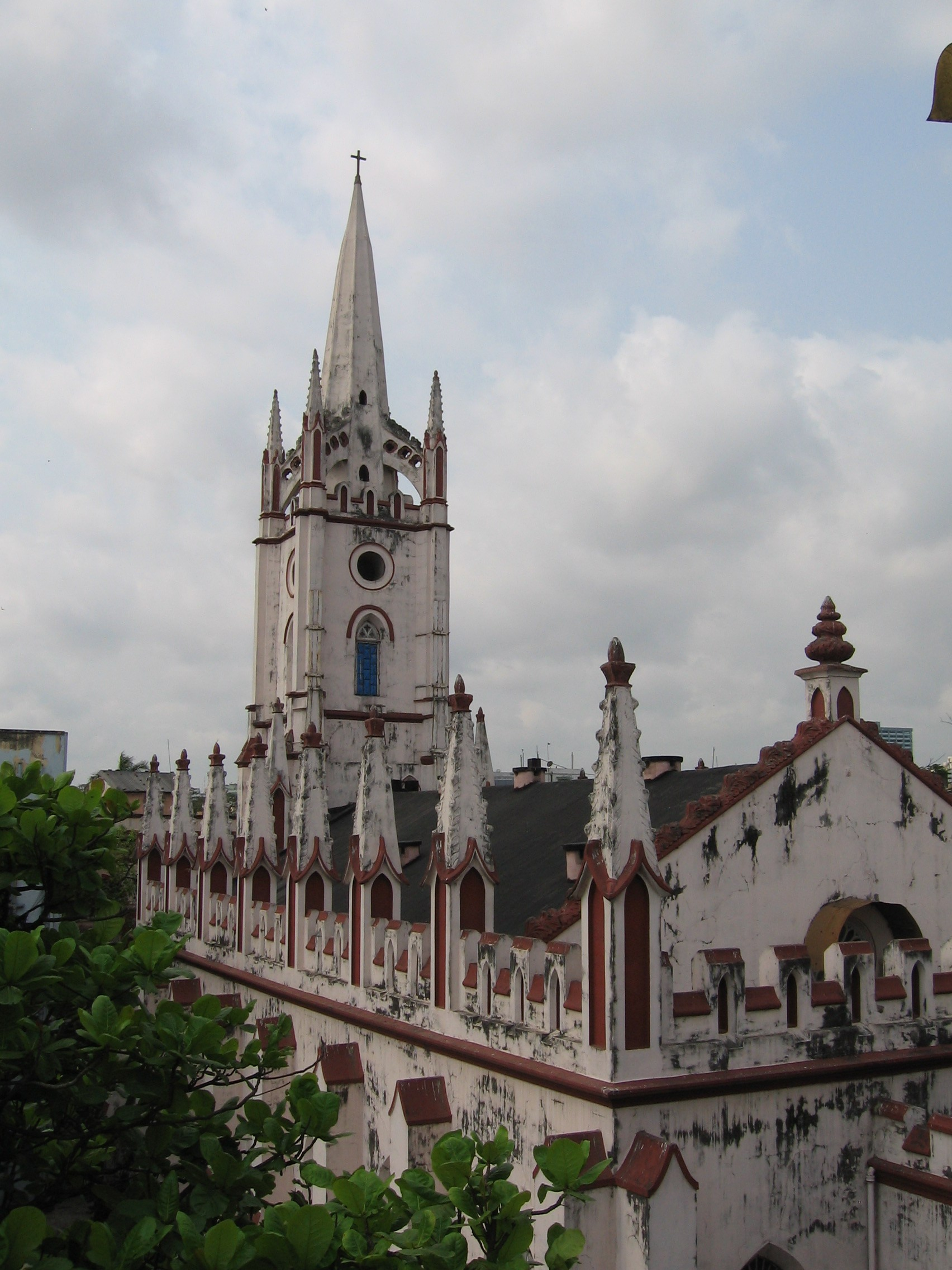
Church of the Lord Jesus, Kolkata, Rafi Ahmed Kidwai Road

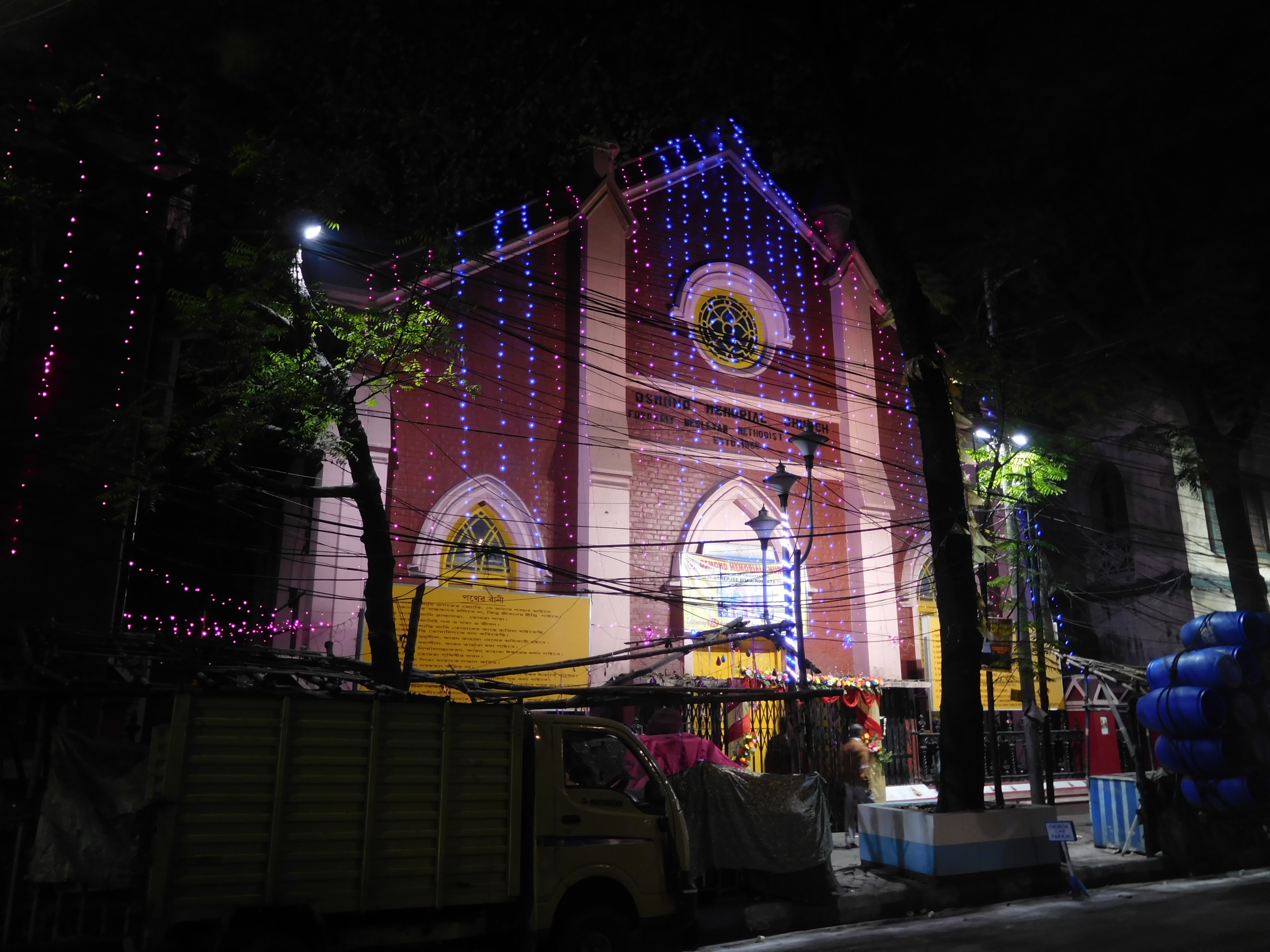
Osmond Memorial Church, S.N. Banerjee Road

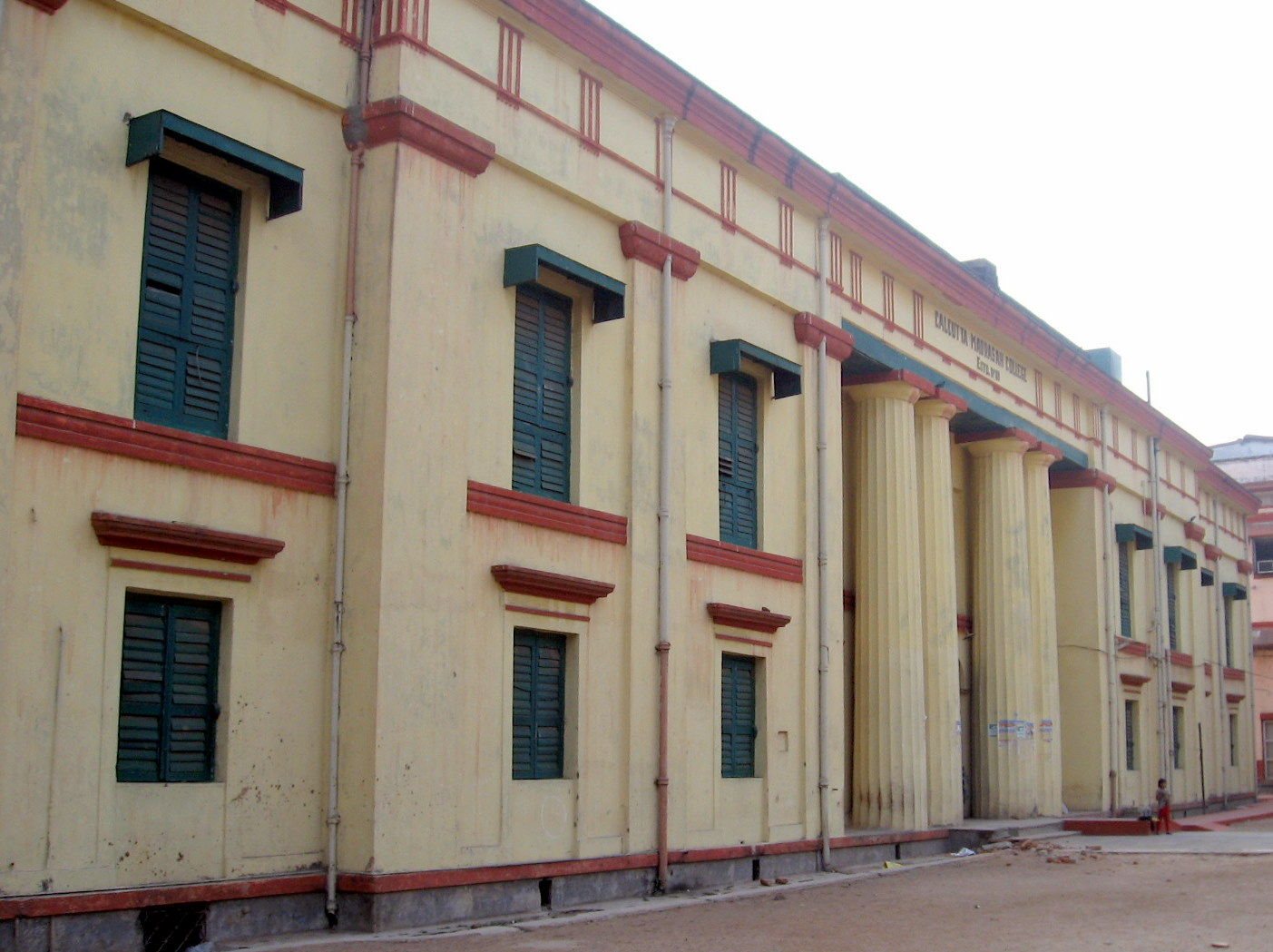
Calcutta Madrsah College established in 1780

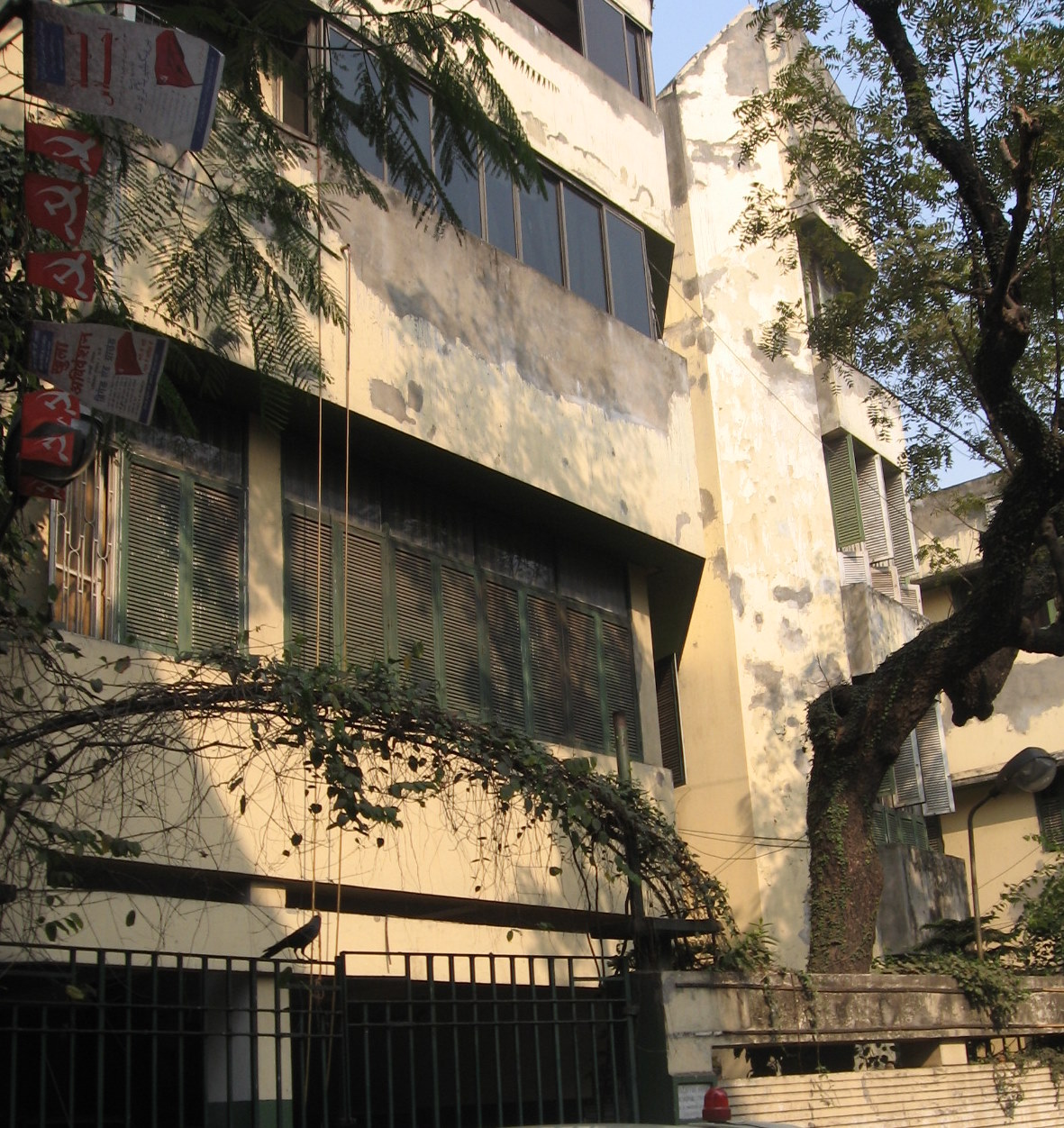
Muzaffar Ahmed Bhawan, CPI(M) party office at 31 Alimuddin Street

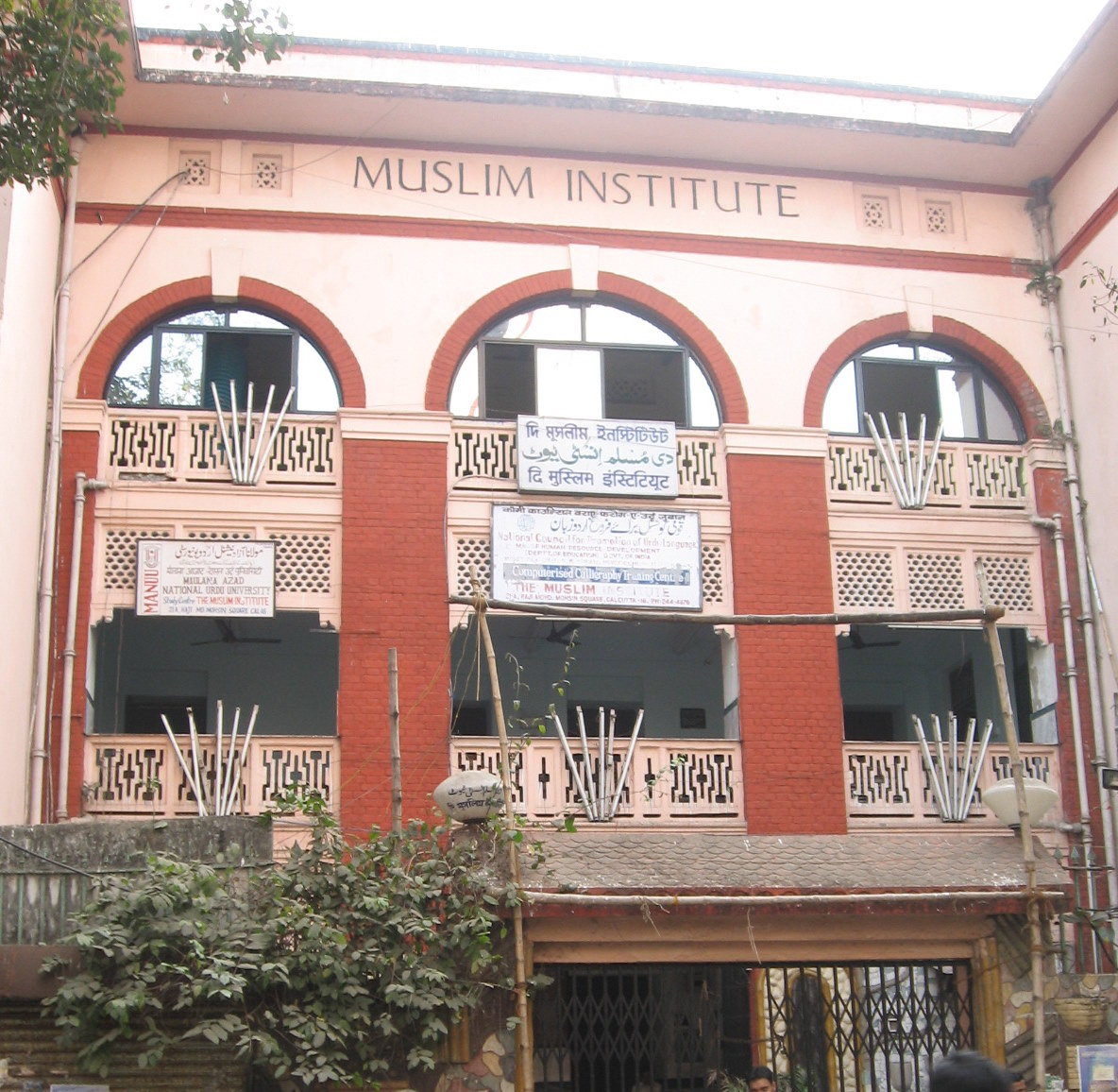
Muslim Institute

== See also ==
- Taltola (Vidhan Sabha constituency)
