= Posta, Burrabazar =

Posta
- Neighbourhood in Kolkata (Calcutta)
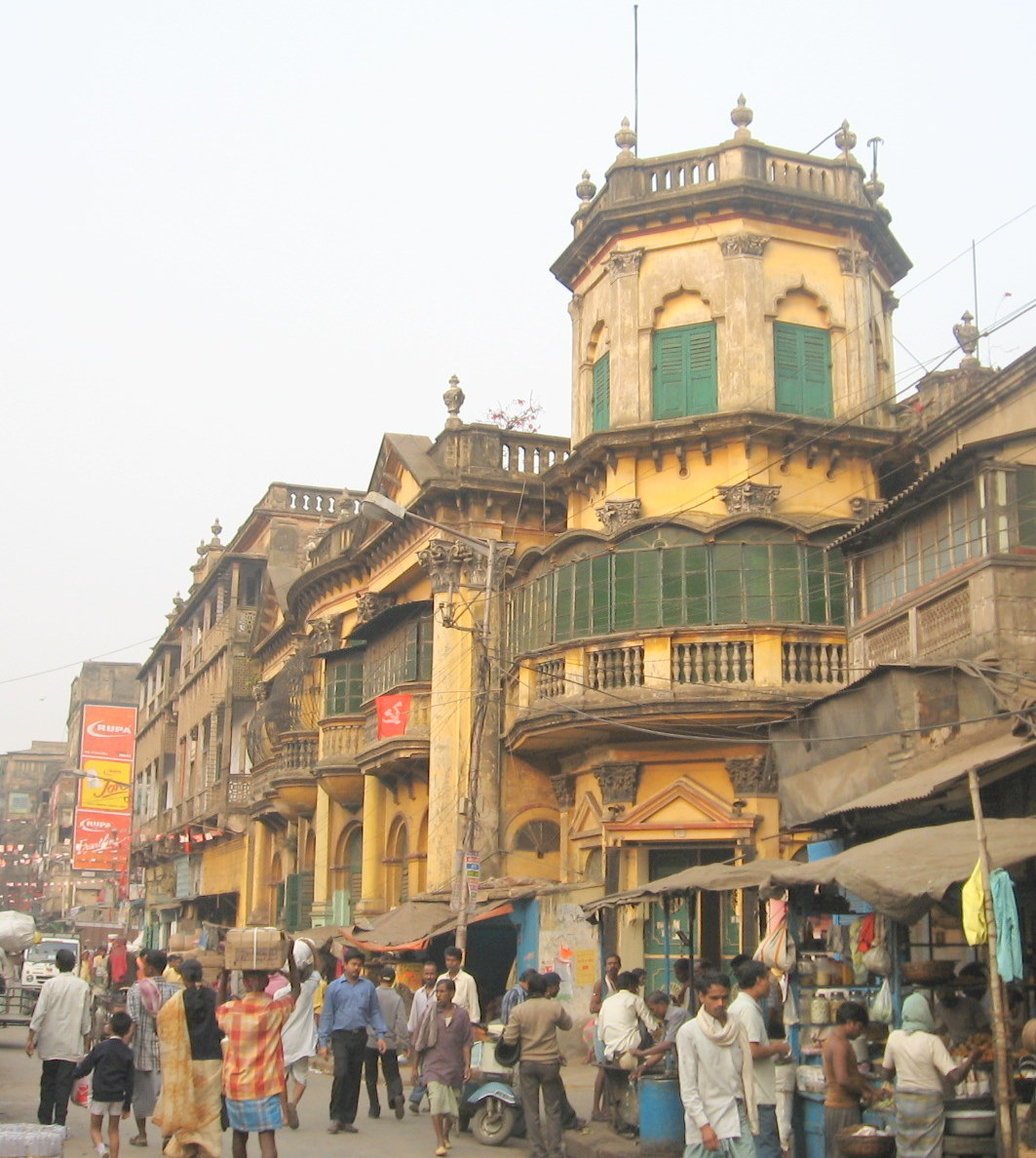
- Part of Posta Rajbari

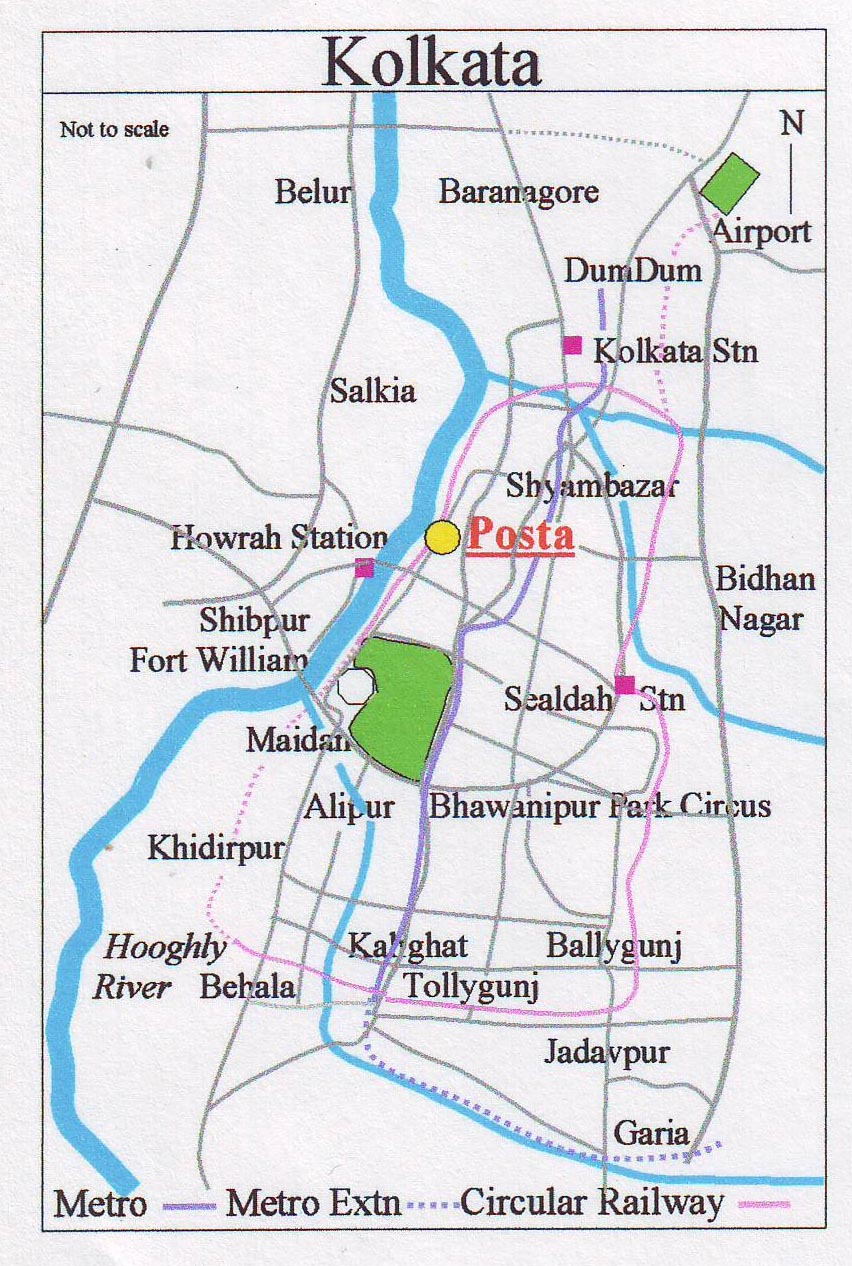
- Coordinates: 22.5875°N 88.3525°E
- Country: India
- State: West Bengal
- City: Kolkata
- District: Kolkata
- Metro Station: Girish Park and Sobhabazar Sutanuti
- Municipal Corporation: Kolkata Municipal Corporation
- KMC wards: 21, 22, 23
- Elevation: 36 ft (11 m)

Population
  - Total: For population see linked KMC ward pages
- Time zone: UTC+5:30 (IST)
- PIN: 700007
- Area code: +91 33
- Lok Sabha constituency: Kolkata Uttar
- Vidhan Sabha constituency: Jorasanko

See Posta and Poşta for disambiguation.

Posta (also known as Posta Bazar) is a neighbourhood in North Kolkata, in Kolkata district in the Indian state of West Bengal. Once a citadel of Bengali mercantile aristocracy, it is now an extension of the whole sale market in neighbouring Burrabazar, dominated by Marwaris. The wholesale market features a wide range of products such as edible oil, salt, cereals, spices, food grains, sugar, and vanaspati products.

== Etymology ==
Posta literally meaning 'Quay' or 'landing space for loading and unloading ships' or 'Jetty'. This place is mainly used by the zamindars of Jorasanko and businessmen of Burrabazar.

== History ==
The descendants of Raja Ram Chandra Roy formed the Jorasanko Raj Family and that of Raja Baidyanath Roy formed the Cossipur Raj Family. The descendants of Raja Nursingh Chandra Roy inherited Maharaj Sukhamay Roy's Posta Rajbari. The later descendants of Posta Raj family include Raja Rajkumar Roy, Raja Radhaprosad Roy, Rani Kosturi Monjuri Devi, one of the most influential women of her times, was known for maintaining close ties with Jnanadanandini Devi, wife of Satyendranath Tagore. Later descends were Kumar Bishnu Prosad Roy, Jitendra Nath Roy, Pronab Kumar Roy, Prodyut Kumar Roy, Dilip Kumar Roy, Amit Kumar Roy, Arnab Roy, Priyojit Roy, Abhishek Roy, Riddhiman Roy, Kuntal Roy. The family was invested in the Swadeshi Movement during the independence struggle. Mahatma Gandhi visited the house and spun his Charka in presence of Kumar Bishnu Prasad Roy. The Thakurbari houses the Family deity Sri Sri Ishwar Shyamsundar Jew. The current titular head of house is Jitendranath Roy. As a mark of respect to the 26th Amendment Act, all titles previously held have been discarded.

== Geography ==
=== Police district ===
Posta police station is part of the Central division of Kolkata Police. It is located at 67/50 Strand Road, Kolkata-700007.

Taltala Women police station covers all police districts under the jurisdiction of the Central division i.e. Bowbazar, Burrabazar, Girish Park, Hare Street, Jorasanko, Muchipara, New Market, Taltala and Posta.

== Economics ==
=== Wholesale market ===
In the Vision 2025, the 20-year perspective for the overall development of Kolkata Metropolitan Area, the proposal is to shift the wholesale market to New Town, because it has adequate infrastructure.

== Culture ==
Sukumar Ray, Bengali humorous poet, has mentioned the neighbourhood in his collection of non-sense rhymes, Aboltabol, through which children in Bengal get acquainted with it. His lines are:

suntey pelam Posta giye,
tomar naki meyer biye…

Heard your daughter's getting married,
From Posta, the news I carried.

== Transport ==
=== Road ===
Posta is surrounded by Strand Road on the west, MG Road on the south, Kalakar Street on the east and Kali Krishna Tagore Street on the north. Many buses and auto-rickshaws ply along these roads.

=== Train ===
Burra Bazar railway station on Kolkata Circular Railway line is the nearest railway station.

== Gallery ==
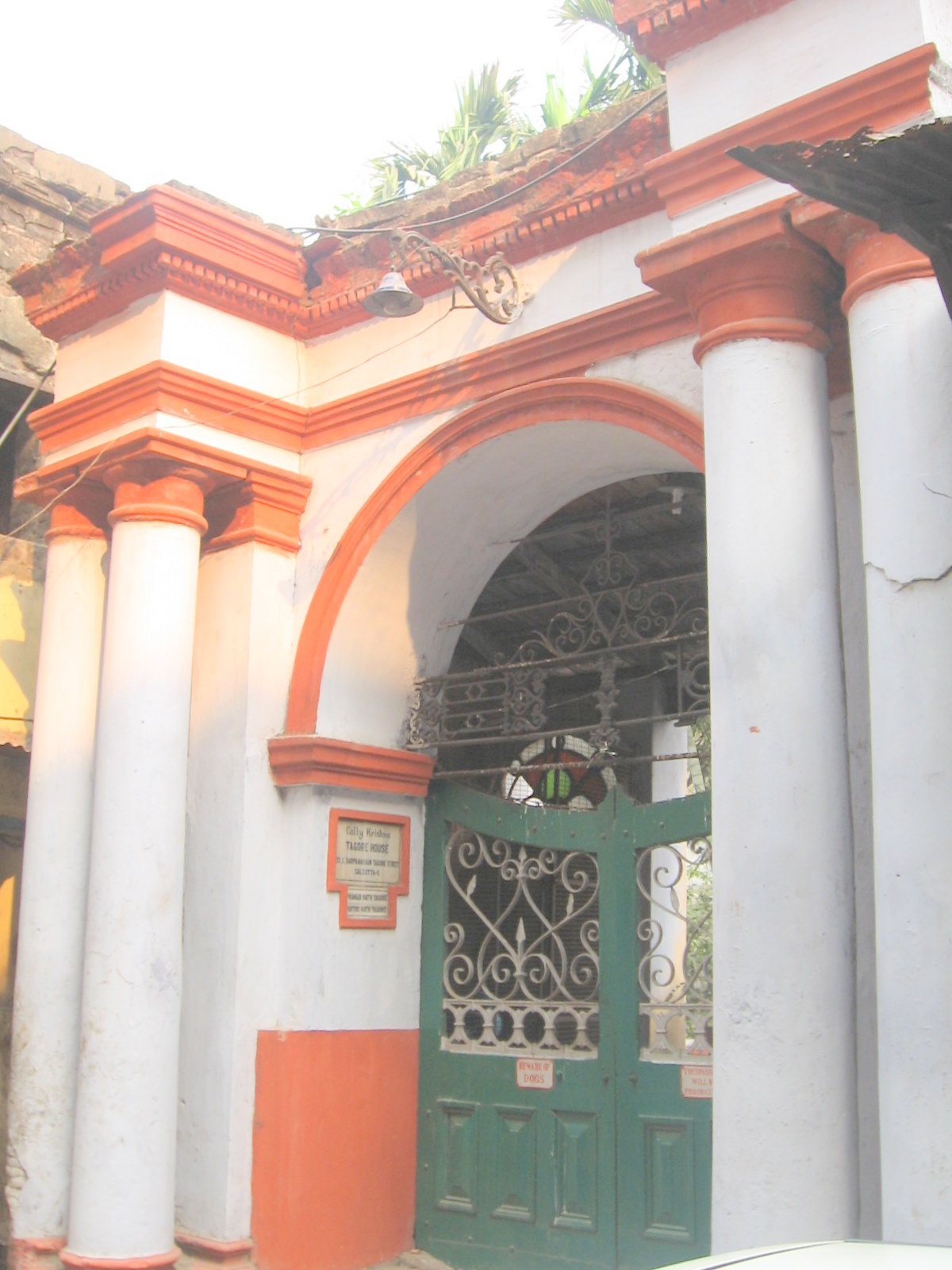
Gate of the "Kali Krishna Tagore House" on Darpanarayan Tagore Street

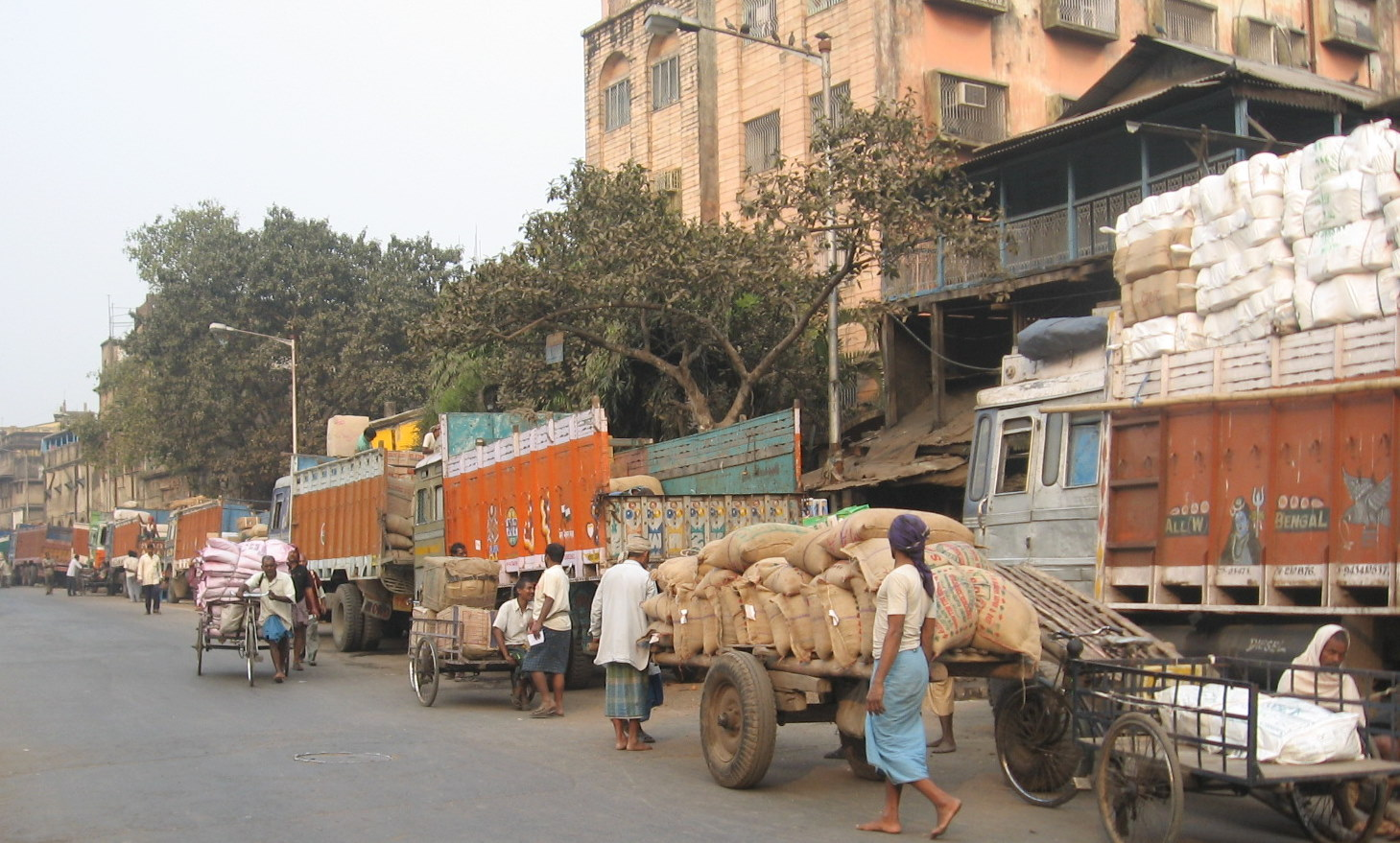
Transport line up for movement of goods

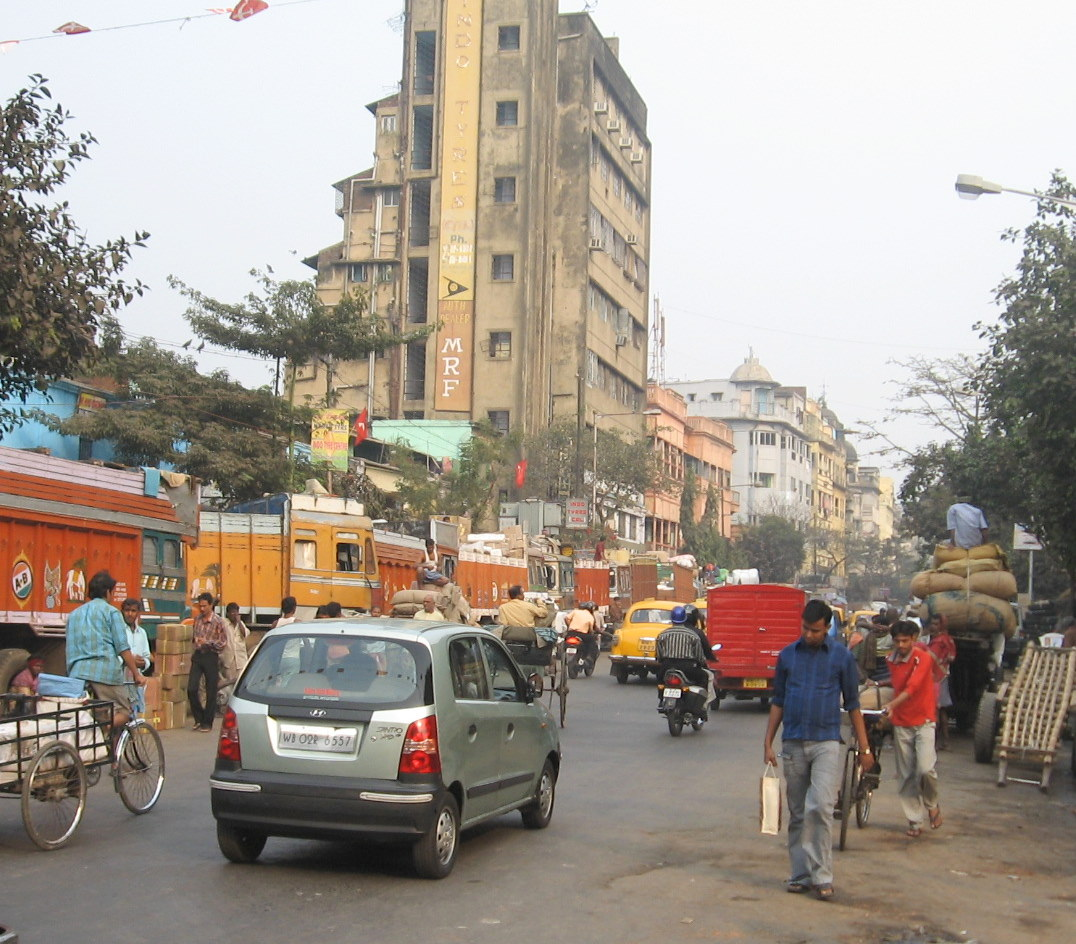
Busy road passing through Posta

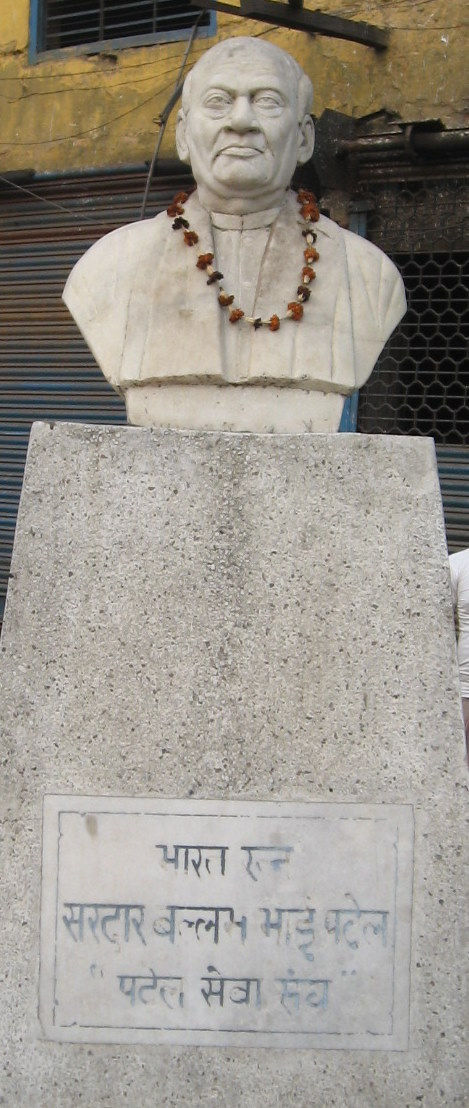
Bust of Sardar Vallabhbhai Patel in Posta
