= Burrabazar =

Neighbourhood in Kolkata, West Bengal, India

Burrabazar Barabazar
- Neighbourhood in Kolkata (Calcutta)
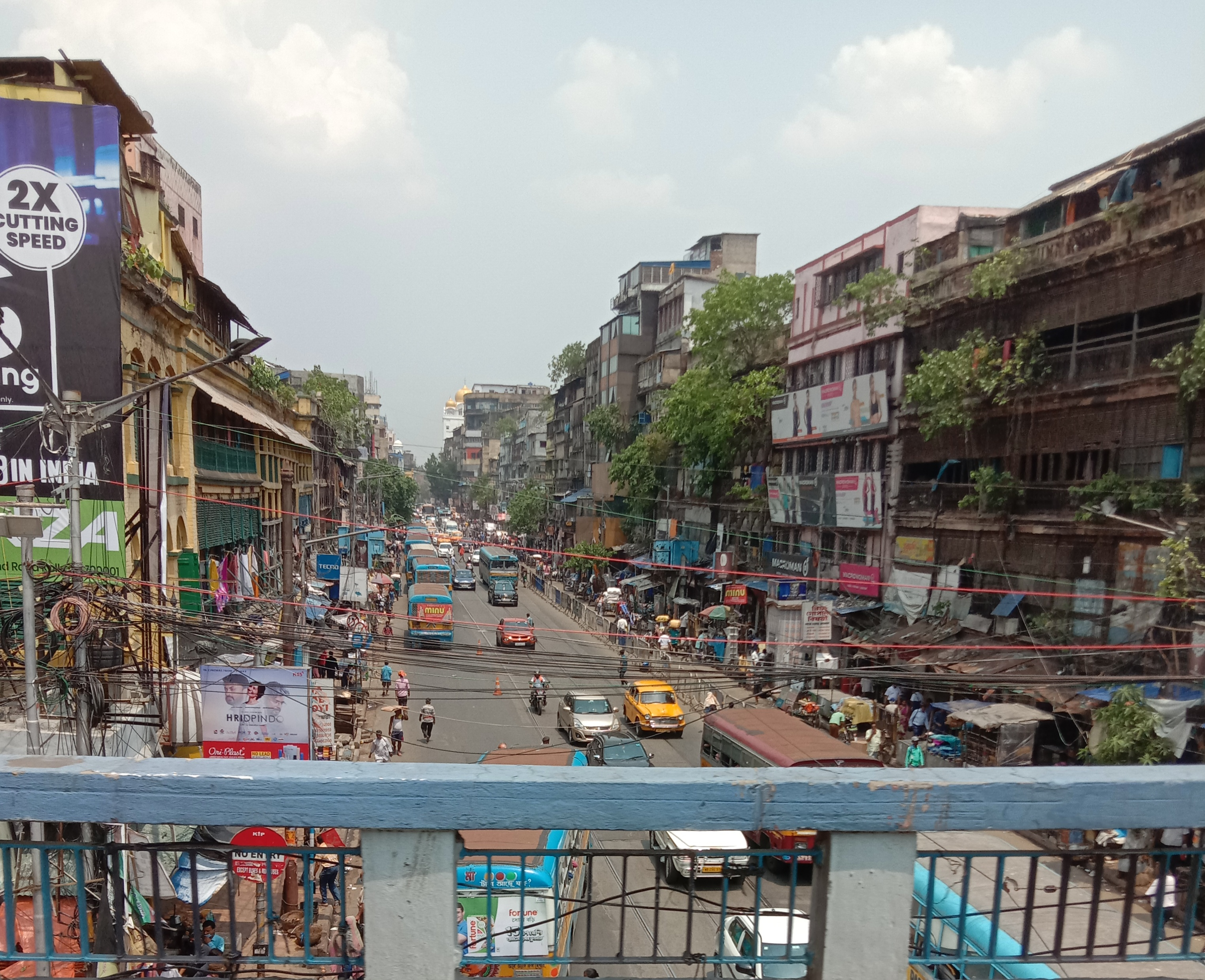
- Mahatma Gandhi Road

- Location in Kolkata
- Coordinates: 22.582°N 88.352°E
- Country: India
- State: West Bengal
- City: Kolkata
- District: Kolkata
- KMC wards: 41, 42, 43, 44, 45
- Metro Station: MG Road and Mahakaran
- Kolkata Circular Railway: Burrabazar

Government
  - MLA: Smita Bakshi
- Elevation: 11 m (36 ft)
- Time zone: UTC+5:30 (IST)
- PIN: 700001, 700007
- Area code: +91 33
- Lok Sabha constituency: Kolkata Uttar
- Vidhan Sabha constituency: Jorasanko and Chowrangee

Burrabazar (also spelt as Bara Bazar) is a neighbourhood of Central-North Kolkata, in Kolkata district in the Indian state of West Bengal.

== Bazar Kolkata ==
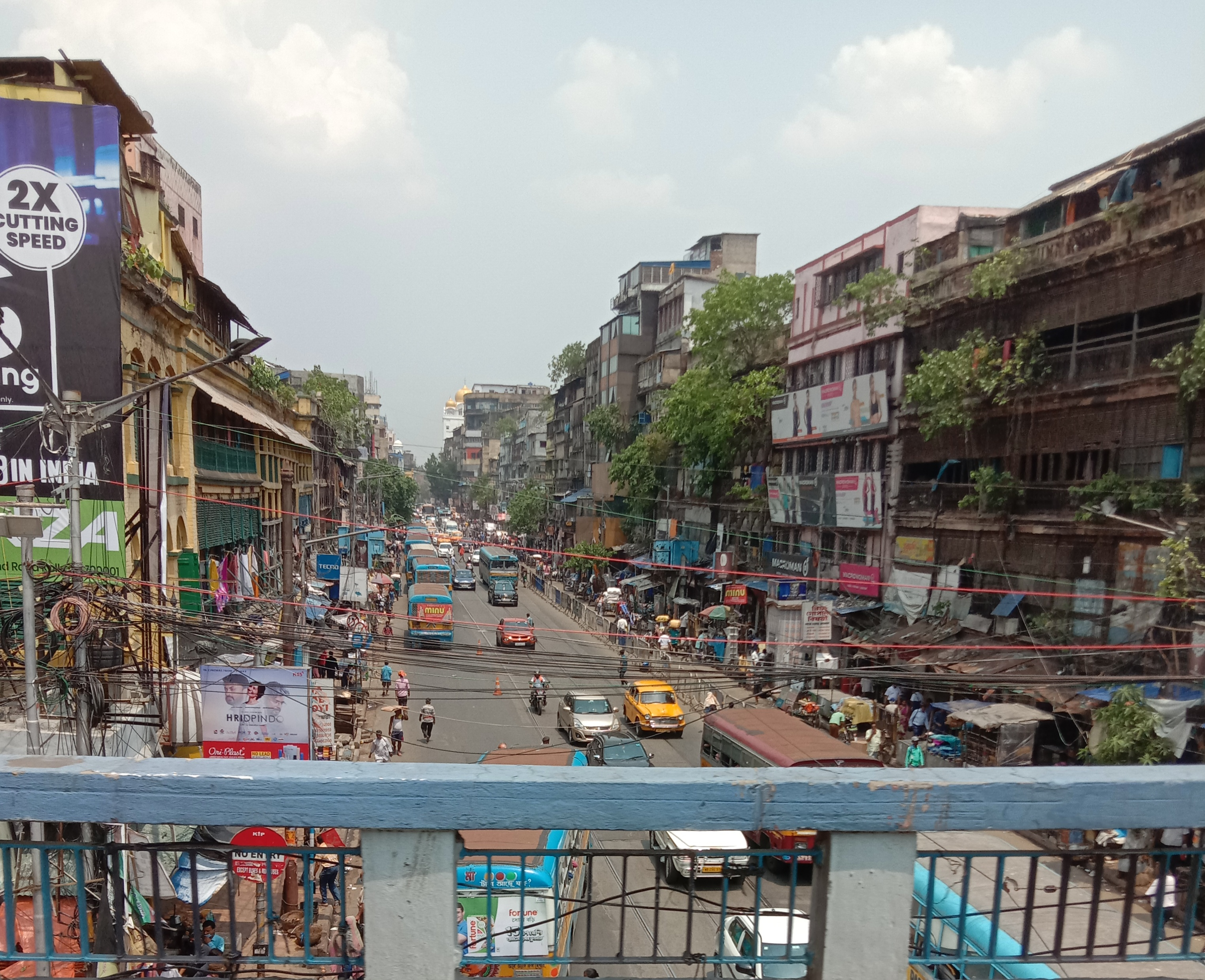
A view of Burrabazar and Mahatma Gandhi Road (formerly Harrison Road) in Kolkata.

In the 18th century, the Sutanuti haat was gradually replaced by Bazar Kolkata. The market was covered nearly 500 bighas, while the surrounding residential area extended over another 400 bighas. Prominent families included the Seths and Basaks, along with gold merchants such as Mullicks, whose wealth and social prominence were widely note. The area also housed merchants of more modest means, for example, the neighborhood around present-day Kalakar Street was known as Dhakapattys, home to the Sahas, cloth merchants originally from Dhaka. The Sheths and Basaks maintained close tied with major cloth-producing centres, including Dhaka, Murshidabad, and Cossimbazar.

== Police section house ==
In 1888, one of the 25 newly organized police section houses was located in Burrabazar.

== Geography ==
=== Police district ===
Burrabazar police station is part of the Central division of Kolkata Police. It is located at 8, Mullick Street, Kolkata-700007.

Taltala Women police station covers all police districts under the jurisdiction of the Central division i.e. Bowbazar, Burrabazar, Girish Park, Hare Street, Jorasanko, Muchipara, New Market, Taltala and Posta.

== Administration ==
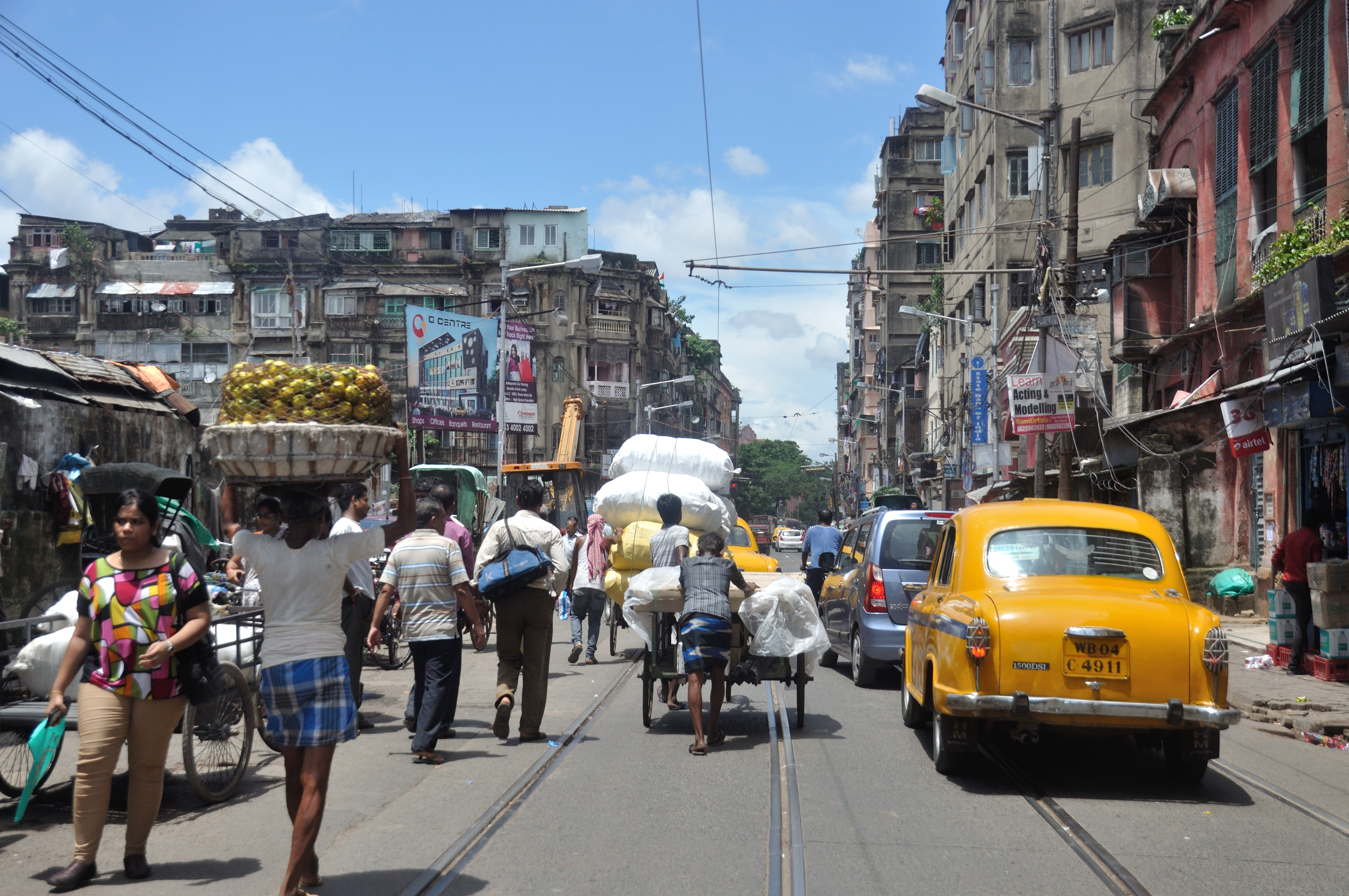
Rabindra Sarani is considered as an extension of Burrabazar

With crime a major problem in Burrabazar till 2008, the police station had a rough time.

More than 50,000 merchants from across the country have been attracted to Burrabazar because of the immense business opportunities but musclemen have followed them to the trade hub. From providing protection to businessmen and transporting their black money to running a satta (form of betting) racket and settling property and payment disputes, these men, mostly from the neighbouring states, start off as confidantes of the trading community. In a few years, they break free and form their own gangs to extort money and engage in other forms of criminal activities.

Even small traders coming to Burrabazar face problems, but of a different sort. More than 1,000 cyclists cross Howrah Bridge everyday to make purchases at Burrabazar. Most of these are small traders, from across the Hooghly River and they carry back goods for sale in their localities. Such people are regularly harassed by policemen on duty and let off against small payments.

=== Traffic ===
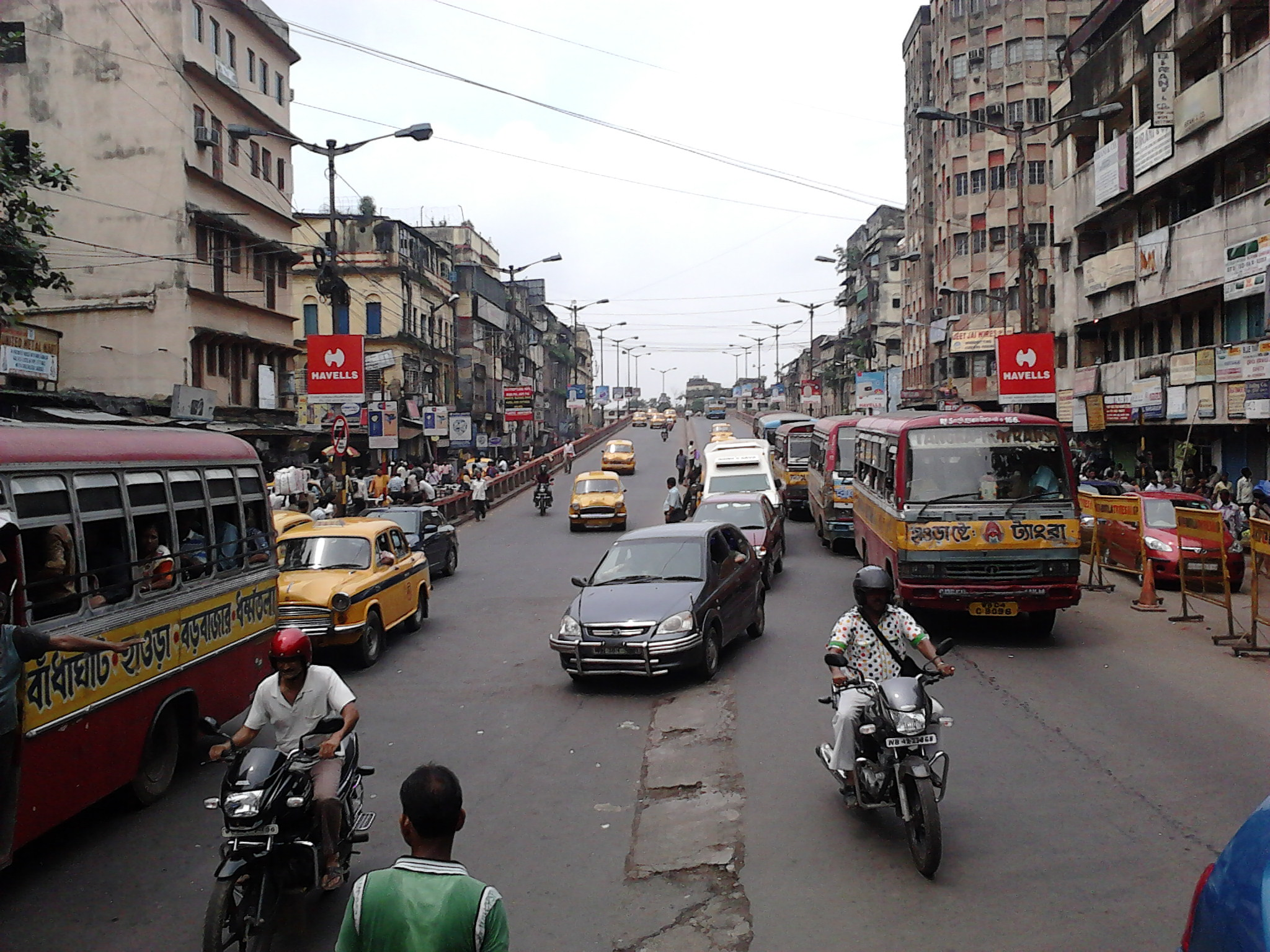
Brabourne Road Flyover, Burrabazar

Traffic in the area, including the approach road to Howrah Bridge, has been a long-standing problem for people passing through the area. Pedestrians are forced to walk on roads along with vehicles. While lorries, taxis, vans and three-wheel goods carriers crowd the main roads, slow-moving vehicles like cycle-vans and carts clog the side-streets. A large number of governmental public buses and private buses ply through Burrabazar. Kolkata tram route no. 18 serves Burrabazar (via MG Road). Braborne Road Flyover (1.2 km stretch) connects Howrah Bridge with Braborne Road in Burrabazar.

=== Unsafe buildings ===
On 31 March 2016, a flyover on Vivekananda Road near Burrabazar collapsed, killing 22 people and injuring many more.

=== Fire hazards ===
Along with buildings in danger of collapsing, the fire services department has fixed its gaze on structures in Burrabazar that can catch fire any moment because of faulty wiring. According to fire service officials, most of the 50-odd fires that broke out in the trade hub in 2005 were caused by short circuits, a consequence of faulty connections. At least 500 buildings in Burrabazar can be described as fire hazards. A disaster can strike any day. There are numerous building with hundreds of temporary electrical connections. Most tenants have drawn up temporary connections, ignoring all rules. These illegal and haphazard connections often lead to short circuits and fire.

According to fire brigade officials, "It is generally believed that there are more fires during Kali puja. However, the number of fires during pujas has gone down considerably in recent times due to imposition of the fire-safety norms. There used to be around 15 fires during Durga puja and over 100 fires during Kali puja. In 2005, there was only one fire during Durga puja and no fires at all during Kali puja".

In January 2008, fire ravaged Nandram market in Burrabazar for nearly a week. More than 1,200 shops went up in flames. Three hundred fire fighters and 54 fire tenders were sent to fight the fire. More than 1,000 people, who live in neighbouring residential apartments, were evacuated. Traffic in the area was thrown out of gear.

Fires are regular features in Burrabazar. In January 2000, rows of shops were gutted at Manohar Das Katra. In December 2002, there was fire in the wholesale market of woollen goods. In April 2003, fire struck Satyanarayan Park AC market. In September 2004 there was fire in a sari shop in Hari Ram Goenka Street. In July 2005, there was fire at a hosiery warehouse, off Kalakar Street. In September 2005, there was fire in a Jackson Lane warehouse filled with plastic and paper. In March 2006, there was fire in a bank on Ezra Street.

A fire devastated the five floors of Bagree Market in September 2018, affecting some 500 traders, who lost 2-5 billion rupees, and about 3,000 staff. The All India Federation of Tax Practitioners organised a free helpline for the traders who lost their documents and found it difficult to prepare their accounts.

== See also ==
- Arabber
- Bara Bazar (Vidhan Sabha constituency)
- Bazaar
- Bazaari
- Hawker centre (Asia) a centre where street food is sold
- Haat bazaar
- Peddler
- Retail
- Street vendor
- Street food
