= Vijay Ojha =

Indian politician

Member of the West Bengal Legislative Assembly
- Incumbent
- Assumed office 4 May 2026
- Preceded by: Vivek Gupta
- Constituency: Jorasanko

Councillor of Ward No. 23, Kolkata Municipal Corporation
- In office 17 November 2021 – December 2026

Personal details
- Born: 1974 (age 51–52)
- Party: Bharatiya Janata Party
- Parent: Gouri Shankar Ojha
- Profession: Politician, Businessman, Social Worker.

Vijay Ojha is a politician from West Bengal. He is a member of West Bengal Legislative Assembly, from Jorasanko Assembly constituency. He is a member of Bharatiya Janata Party.

He is also serving as a Councillor of Ward No. 23, Kolkata Municipal Corporation for 2nd Term. He defeated Trinamool Congress MLA Candidate Vijay Upadhayay by 5797 votes.
