= Posta =

Posta or La Posta may refer to:

== Places ==
- Posta, Pirna, part of the town of Pirna, Saxony, Germany
- Posta, Burrabazar, a neighbourhood in Kolkata, India
- Posta, Lazio, Italy, a comune (municipality), in the Province of Rieti
- Poșta (disambiguation), various villages in Romania
- Posta, the central business district of Dar es Salaam, Tanzania

== People ==
- Adrienne Posta (born 1948), English actress and singer
- Sándor Pósta (1888–1952), Hungarian fencer and Olympic champion in the sabre competition
- La Posta Band of Diegueño Mission Indians, a federally recognized Native American tribe

== Other uses ==
- Posta Rangers F.C., a Kenyan professional football club based in Nairobi
- Posta (newspaper), a popular Turkish tabloid
- Posta Sandstone, a type of sandstone in Germany
- "Posta" (song), by Tini from the 2024 album Un Mechón de Pelo
- Posta seeds, another name for Khas khas (opium poppy) seeds, used mainly in cooking in India
- La Posta Astro-Geophysical Observatory, a former radio telescope at Campo, California, United States
- La Posta Mountain Warfare Training Facility, former name of Mountain Warfare Training Camp Michael Monsoor, near Campo, California, a United States Navy training facility

== See also ==
- Posta Fibreno, Italy, a comune (municipality)
- Posta Ybycua, a division (compañía) of the city Capiatá in Central Department, Paraguay
- Posta del Chuy, a historic inn near Melo, Cerro Largo, Uruguay
