= B.B.D. Bag railway station =

Railway station in West Bengal, India

B.B.D Bag
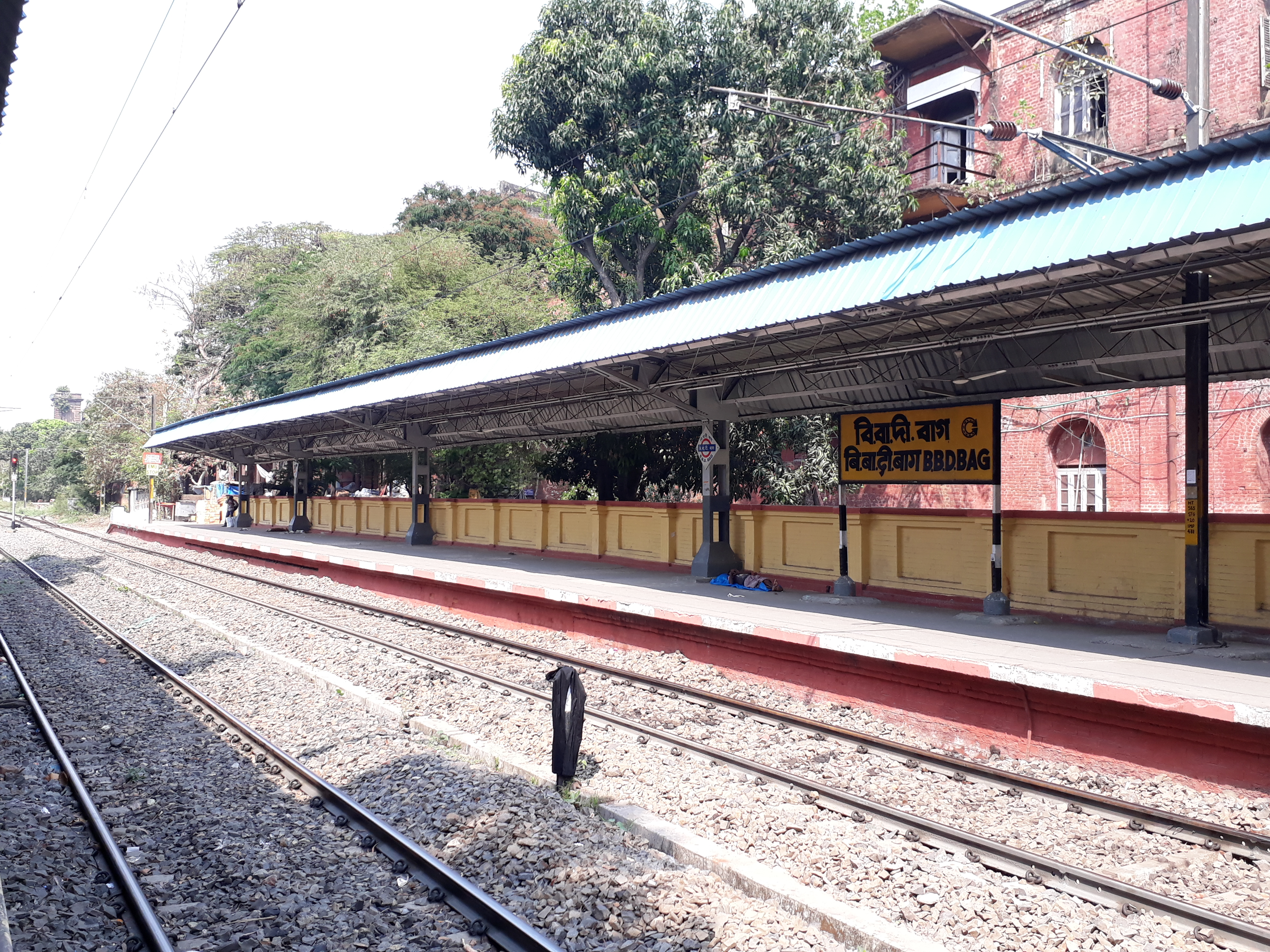
- B.B.D Bag railway station

General information
- Location: B.B.D. Bagh, Kolkata, West Bengal; India
- Coordinates: 22.576846°N 88.346636°E
- Elevation: 9 metres (30 ft)
- System: Kolkata Suburban Railway
- Owner: Indian Railways
- Operator: Eastern Railway
- Platforms: 2
- Tracks: 2
- Connections: Mahakaran; Fairlie Place Ghat

Construction
- Structure type: At grade, Double-track railway
- Parking: Not available
- Cycle facilities: Not available
- Accessible: Not available

Other information
- Status: Functioning
- Station code: BBDB
- Zone(s): Eastern Railway
- Division(s): Sealdah

History
- Opened: 1984; 42 years ago
- Electrified: 1984; 42 years ago
Services
Preceding station	Kolkata Suburban Railway	Following station
Burra Bazar towards Dum Dum Junction	Circular Line	Eden Gardens towards Dum Dum Junction
Route map
Location

B.B.D Bag railway station is a Kolkata Suburban Railway station in BBD Bagh. It serves the local areas of BBD Bagh and Fairly Place in the Kolkata, West Bengal, India. This is a very important station and is mostly used by office goers. The station has two platforms. Its station code is BBDB.

== Station complex ==
The platform is very much well sheltered. The station has many facilities including water and sanitation. It is well connected to the Strand Road.

=== Station layout ===
G	Street level	Exit/Entrance
P1	Side platform No- 1, doors will open on the left
P1		Towards →Eden Gardens→ →
P1		→Towards ←Burra Bazar← ←
P1	Side platform No- 2, doors will open on the left
P2

== Connections ==
=== Bus ===
From Fairlie Place – Bus route number C, 12A, 12AD, 12C, 12C/1, 12C/1A, 12C/1B, 12C/2, 13, 13A, 17, 17B, 18A, 18A/1, 18D, 24A, 24A/1, 37, 37A, 39, 41, 41B, 52, 54, 55, 55A, 57, 59, 73, 75 (Esplanade to Kadamtala), 205, 208, 212, 214, 259, 1 (Mini), 1A (Mini), 2 (Mini), 3 (Mini), 3A (Mini), 6 (Mini), 6A (Mini), 8 (Mini), 10 (Mini), 11 (Mini), 11A (Mini), 18 (Mini), 21 (Mini), 26 (Mini), 27 (Mini), 27A (Mini), 30 (Mini), 31 (Mini), 32 (Mini), 38 (Mini), 39 (Mini), S101 (Mini), S101/1 (Mini), S102 (Mini), S103 (Mini), S104 (Mini), S105 (Mini), S106 (Mini), S107 (Mini), S107/1 (Mini), S108 (Mini), S108/1 (Mini), S108/2 (Mini), S109 (Mini), S110 (Mini), S111 (Mini), S112 (Mini), S113 (Mini), S116 (Mini), S117 (Mini), S118 (Mini), S119 (Mini), S119/1 (Mini), S120 (Mini), S121 (Mini), S122 (Mini), S123 (Mini), S124 (Mini), S125 (Mini), S126 (Mini), S128 (Mini), S129 (Mini), S135 (Mini), S151 (Mini), S152 (Mini), S158 (Mini), S159 (Mini), S163 (Mini), S164 (Mini), S165 (Mini), S166 (Mini), S167 (Mini), S171 (Mini), S173 (Mini), S175 (Mini), S181 (Mini), S184 (Mini), M14 (Mini), C7, C11, C24, C26, C28, C37, C38, C42, C44, D7/1, E1, E4, E47, EB24, M7B, M7C, M7E, MIDI1, 7A, S2, S3A, S3B, S4C, S5, S5C, S6A, S7, S10A, S12, S12D, S24, S47, S47A, T2, T8, T12, AC1, AC4, AC5, AC6, AC12, AC12D, AC20, AC24, AC39, AC52 serve the station.

=== Metro ===
Mahakaran metro station is located nearby.

== See also ==
- North 24 Parganas district
- Indian Railways
- Sealdah railway station
- Kolkata Suburban Railway
- Dum Dum Cantonment railway station
- Transport in West Bengal
- List of railway stations in India
