= Dinesh Bajaj =

Indian politician

Member of West Bengal Legislative Assembly
- In office 2006–2011
- Preceded by: Satya Narayan Bajaj
- Succeeded by: Smita Bakshi
- Constituency: Jorasanko

Personal details
- Born: 29 August 1969 (age 56)
- Party: Trinamool Congress (1998–2021, 2024–present); Bharatiya Janata Party (2021–2024)

Dinesh Bajaj is an Indian politician who previously belonged to Trinamool Congress. He was elected as MLA of Jorasanko in 2006. His father Satya Narayan Bajaj was a legislator of West Bengal Legislative Assembly. On 31 March 2021, Bajaj joined the Bharatiya Janata Party

He rejoined TMC in 2024.
