= Santanu Sen =

Indian doctor and politician

Member of Parliament, Rajya Sabha
- In office 3 April 2018 – 2 April 2024
- Preceded by: Vivek Gupta
- Succeeded by: Sushmita Dev
- Constituency: West Bengal

Councillor of Kolkata Municipal Corporation
- In office 2015–2021
- Preceded by: Brojendra Kumar Bose
- Succeeded by: Debika Chakraborty
- Constituency: Ward No. 3

Councillor of Kolkata Municipal Corporation
- In office 2010–2015
- Preceded by: Bishnupada Ghosh
- Succeeded by: Puspali Sinha
- Constituency: Ward No. 2

Personal details
- Born: 26 December 1972 (age 53) Kolkata, West Bengal, India
- Party: Trinamool Congress
- Spouse: Dr. Kakoli Sen
- Children: 1

Santanu Sen is an Indian doctor and politician. He was a councilor in the Kolkata Municipal Corporation. He was a former Rajya Sabha member from West Bengal. He was the President of the Indian Medical Association.

On 28 May 2026, Sen resigned as spokesman of the TMC, citing the previous state government's handling of the 2024 Kolkata rape and murder as his reason for stepping down.

== Life ==
Shantanu Sen was born into a Bengali family.

== Controversy ==
On 22 July 2021, he snatched the papers on Pegasus scandal from the hands of the IT minister Ashwini Vaishnaw in the Rajya Sabha, tore it and threw it towards the Deputy Chairman. Due to his unparliamentary behavior, he was suspended from the Rajya Sabha for the remaining period of monsoon session.
