= Poșta Veche =

Poşta Veche may refer to the following places:

- Poșta Veche, Stângăceaua, Mehedinți County, Romania
- Poșta Veche, Chișinău, Moldova

== See also ==
- Poșta (disambiguation)
- Old Post Office (Belgrade, Serbia), a former building in modern-day Serbia
