= Eden Gardens railway station =

Railway station in Kolkata, India

Eden Gardens

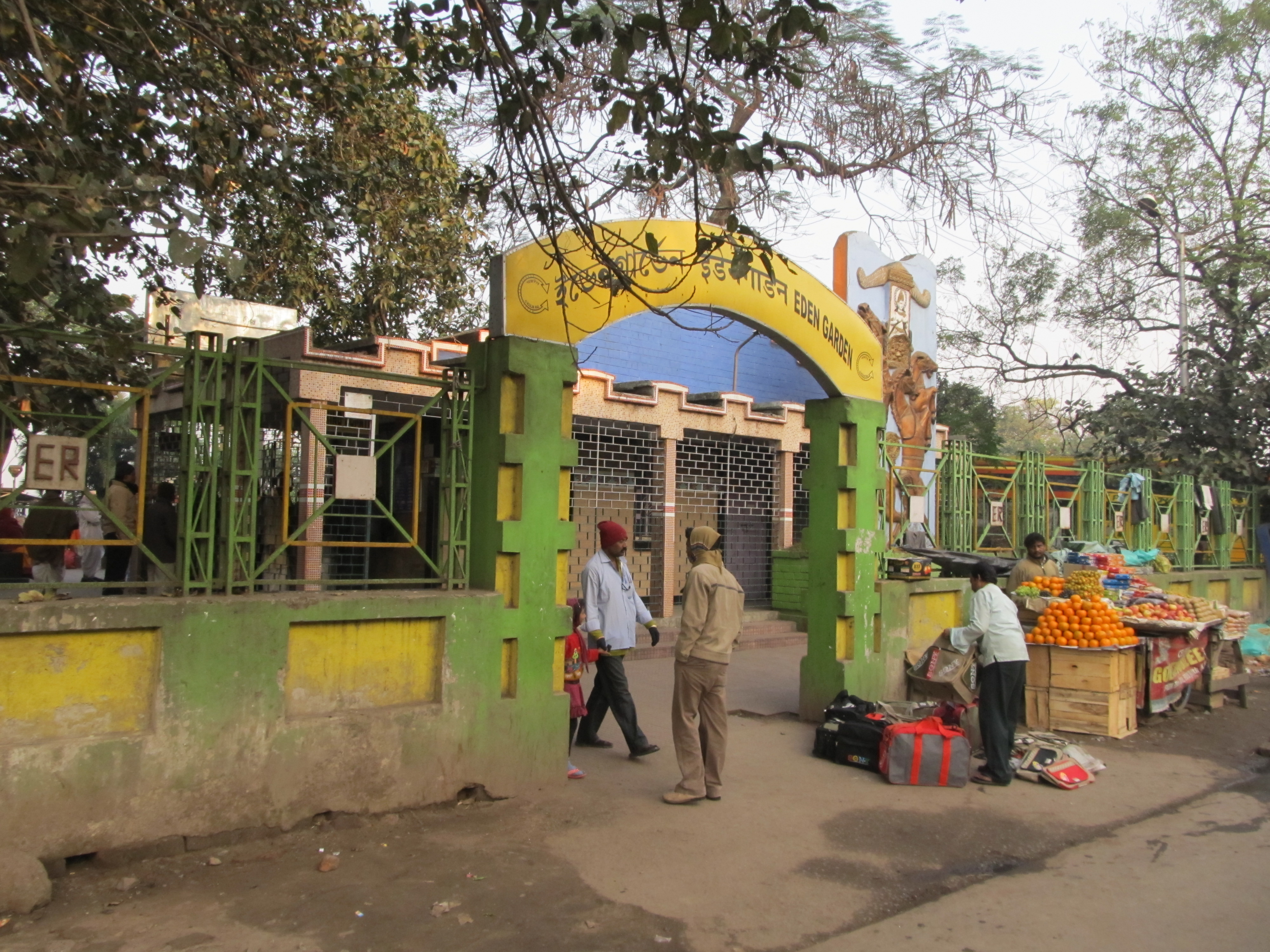
- Eden Gardens railway station on Strand road, Kolkata

General information
- Location: Babughat, Kolkata, West Bengal; India
- Coordinates: 22.564938°N 88.339255°E
- Elevation: 7 metres (23 ft)
- System: Kolkata Suburban Railway station
- Owner: Indian Railways
- Operator: Eastern Railway
- Line: Kolkata Circular line of Kolkata Suburban Railway
- Platforms: 1
- Tracks: 1
- Connections: Eden Gardens; Baboo Ghat Farry; Eden Gardens

Construction
- Structure type: At grade
- Parking: Available
- Cycle facilities: Not available
- Accessible: Not available

Other information
- Status: Functioning
- Station code: EDG
- Zone(s): Eastern Railway
- Division(s): Sealdah

History
- Opened: 1984; 42 years ago
- Electrified: 1984; 42 years ago
Services
Preceding station	Kolkata Suburban Railway	Following station
B.B.D. Bag towards Dum Dum Junction	Circular Line	Prinsep Ghat towards Dum Dum Junction
Route map
Location

Eden Gardens is a railway station in Kolkata under the Kolkata Circular Railway (Chakra Rail) system. It belongs to the Eastern Railway. The station code is EDG. The station gets its name due to its proximity to the famous cricket stadium Eden Gardens of the same name. The station is located on the banks of Hooghly River at Babughat, near busy business area BBD Bagh in Kolkata. After the electrification of circular railway few EMU local trains pass through the station. This is a very important station and is mostly used by office goers. The station has only one platform.

== Station complex ==
The platform is very much well sheltered. The station has many facilities including water and sanitation. It is well connected to the Strand Road.

=== Station layout ===
G	Street level	Exit/Entrance & ticket counter
P1	Side platform, No-1 doors will open on the left/right
P1	Track 1	B.B.D Bag ← toward → Prisep Ghat

== See also ==
- North 24 Parganas district
- Indian Railways
- Sealdah railway station
- Kolkata Suburban Railway
- Dum Dum Cantonment railway station
- Transport in West Bengal
- List of railway stations in India
