= Poșta =

Poşta or Posta may refer to several villages in Romania:

- Poşta, a village in Cilibia Commune, Buzău County
- Poşta, a village in Topliceni Commune, Buzău County
- Poşta, a village in Gohor Commune, Galaţi County
- Poşta, a village in Buturugeni Commune, Giurgiu County
- Poşta, a village in Cernica Commune, Ilfov County
- Posta, a village in Remetea Chioarului Commune, Maramureș County
- Poşta, a village in Frecăţei Commune, Tulcea County
- Poșta Câlnău, a commune in Buzău County

== See also ==
- Poșta Veche (disambiguation)
- Posta (disambiguation)
