= Smita Bakshi =

Indian politician

Member of West Bengal Legislative Assembly
- In office 2011–2021
- Preceded by: Dinesh Bajaj
- Succeeded by: Vivek Gupta
- Constituency: Jorasanko

Personal details
- Born: 5 July 1959 (age 67) Girish Park, Kolkata, West Bengal, India
- Party: Trinamool Congress
- Education: B.SC from Scottish Church College, Calcutta University (1978)

Smita Bakshi is an Indian politician from Kolkata, West Bengal, India. She was the M.L.A of West Bengal Legislative Assembly representing the 165, Jorasanko (Vidhan Sabha constituency) two times (terms 2011 & 2016). She was MLA of Jorasanko, Councillor of KMC Ward 25 & Chairperson of Borough IV, Working President of West Bengal Trinamool Mahila Congress.

== Assembly election 2016 ==
In the 2016 elections, Smita Bakshi of All India Trinamool Congress defeated BJP candidate Rahul Sinha who came second by a very small margin.

West Bengal assembly elections, 2016: Jorasanko
Party	Candidate	Votes
AITMC	SMITA BAKSHI	44,766
BJP	RAHUL SINHA	38,476
RJD	AVINASH KUMAR AGARWAL	15,639
BSP	UTTAM MALI	816
SUCI	BIJNAN KUMAR BERA	641
INDEPENDENT	UTTAM ACHARYA	618
INDEPENDENT	SUNIL ROY	306
JD(S)	MANOJ KUMAR JAISWAL	300
INDEPENDENT	BISWABASU MUKHERJEE	296
INDEPENDENT	SHYAMAL SAMADDAR	218
INDEPENDENT	SANJEEV KUMAR JAIN	180
NOTA		2,374

== See also ==
- Mamata Banerjee
- Dr. Shashi Panja
- All India Trinamool Congress
- Jorasanko (Vidhan Sabha constituency)
- 2016 West Bengal Legislative Assembly election

State Legislative Assembly
Preceded by Dinesh Bajaj	Member of the West Bengal Legislative Assembly from Jorasanko Assembly constituency 2011 –	Incumbent
