= Dhakapattys =

Dhaka migrants

Dhakapattys were a group of migrants from Dhaka who had settled in Assam in the 19th and 20th century. They were skilled workers who were encouraged to migrate by the British Indian colonial officials.

== History ==
After the British East India Company took over Assam they began to encourage migration of specialized workers, such as baker, mattress makers, tailors, etc., from Dhaka. The migrants were supported and protected by the officers of the British East India Company. The process of settlements started in the 19th century after the British East India company annexed Assam and established Colonial Assam. In 1826 the first settlement of Dhakapattys was established in the city of Jorhat in Assam. Gulzar Bepari was the first settler. He established a bakery in Chawk Bazar called Sultan Bakery. Soon other bakers followed, establishing a number of bakeries throughout Assam. The first settler in Nagaon was Amiruddin Bepari.

The settlement of people from Dhaka increased in 1905 when the East Bengal and Assam province was created. The British Raj built railway lines connecting Assam with East Bengal. In the early 20th century, most migrants from Dhaka were Hindus. Many of whom established ayurvedic shops throughout Assam. Paresh Chandra Banik was the first to settle in the city of Silchar. The Muslim migrants used the last name Bepari while the Hindu migrants used Bonik.
