= Jorasanko =

- Neighbourhood in Kolkata (Calcutta)
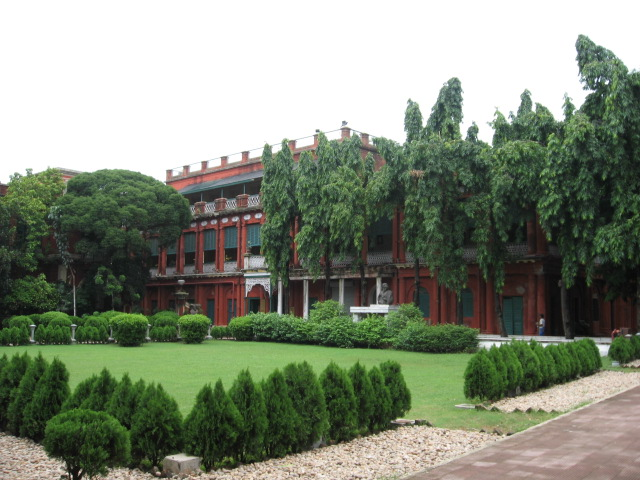
- Jorasanko Thakur Bari, the ancestral house of Rabindranath Tagore, now a campus of Rabindra Bharati University (RBU).

- Location in Kolkata
- Coordinates: 22.5855°N 88.3568°E
- Country: India
- State: West Bengal
- City: Kolkata
- District: Kolkata
- Metro Station: Girish Park
- Municipal Corporation: Kolkata Municipal Corporation
- KMC wards: 23, 25, 41
- Elevation: 36 ft (11 m)
- Time zone: UTC+5:30 (IST)
- PIN: 700007
- Area code: +91 33
- Lok Sabha constituency: Kolkata Uttar
- Vidhan Sabha constituency: Jorasanko

Jorasanko is a neighbourhood of North Kolkata, in Kolkata district, West Bengal, India. It is so called because of the two (jora) wooden or bamboo bridges (sanko) that spanned a small stream at this point.

== History ==
Apart from the distinguished seat of the Tagore family, traditionally known as the Jorasanko Thakur Bari, it was also home of the Singhas (including Kaliprasanna Singha), the Pals (including Krishnadas Pal), and the families of Dewan Banarasi Ghosh, Gokul Chandra Daw, Narsingha Chandra Daw, Prafulla Chandra Gain, Tarak Nath Pramanik and Chandramohan Chatterji. "The area thus became the cradle of Bengal Renaissance." It was earlier known as Mechuabazar.

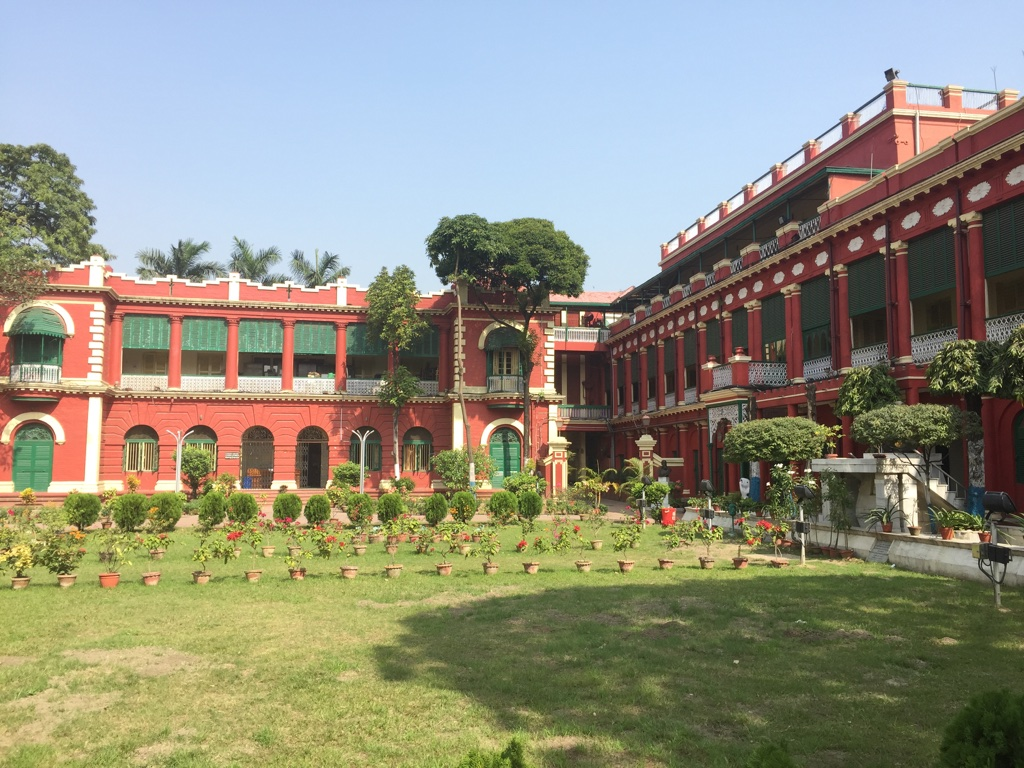
Jorasanko Thakurbari

The earliest list of thanas (police stations) in Kolkata was prepared in 1785 for both police and municipal administration. Jorasanko was one of the 31 thanas then recorded.

Amongst the institutions in Jorasanko are – Adi Brahmo Samaj, the Jorasanko Bharati Natya Samaj, the Kalikata Haribhakti Pradayani Sabha, the Minerva Library and Oriental Seminary. The Oriental Seminary, founded in 1829, was one of the earliest privately-run, modern educational institutions in Kolkata. It was open to middle and lower middle-class Hindu boys only.

Rabindra Bharati University, the third university in Kolkata, was set up in 1962 in the Tagore family's house at Jorasanko, primarily as a centre for music and fine arts, but extended subsequently to arts and humanities.

In 1888, one of the 25 newly organized police section houses was located in Jorasanko.

Jorasanko was historically an important centre of the shell industry in Kolkata, but it has been on the decline in recent years.

== Rabindra Sarani ==
Jorasanko is located on Rabindra Sarani (earlier Chitpore Road). Some people refer to the entire stretch through which Chitpore Road ran as Chitpore or Chitpur; that also includes Jorasanko.

== Theatre ==
A pair of theatres, both named Jorasanko Natyashala, were established in Jorasanko by the Bengalis in the 1800s. The first only lasted for a single play, Shakespeare's Julius Caesar, which was staged on 3 May 1854.

The second was established in the home of Ganendranath Tagore in 1865. The first significant play staged there was Krishnakumari, written by Bengali playwright Michael Madhusudan Dutta. Playwright Jyotirindranath Tagore acted in the production. When the theatre was first established, female roles were played by men, although this practice gradually died out. Finding a dearth of Bengali-language plays to stage, Ganendranath held a contest to promote Bengali playwrights. He offered a prize of 200 rupees (then a large sum) to the winner, and paid for the printing of 1000 copies. Nabanatak by Ramnarayan Tarkaratna won the first prize.

== Geography ==
=== Police district ===
Jorasanko police station is part of the Central division of Kolkata Police. It is located at 16, Bal Mukund Malkar Road, Kolkata-700007.

Taltala Women police station covers all police districts under the jurisdiction of the Central division i.e. Bowbazar, Burrabazar, Girish Park, Hare Street, Jorasanko, Muchipara, New Market, Taltala and Posta.

== Transport ==
=== Road ===
Jorasanko is surrounded by Kalakar Street on the west, MG Road on the south, Chittaranjan Avenue on the east and Kali Krishna Tagore Street-Vivekananda Road on the north. Rabindra Sarani passes through the middle of the locality from north to south. Many buses and auto-rickshaws ply along these roads.

=== Train ===
Burra Bazar railway station on Kolkata Circular Railway line is the nearest railway station. Sealdah Station, one of the major railway-terminals of the city, is also located nearby.

== Gallery ==
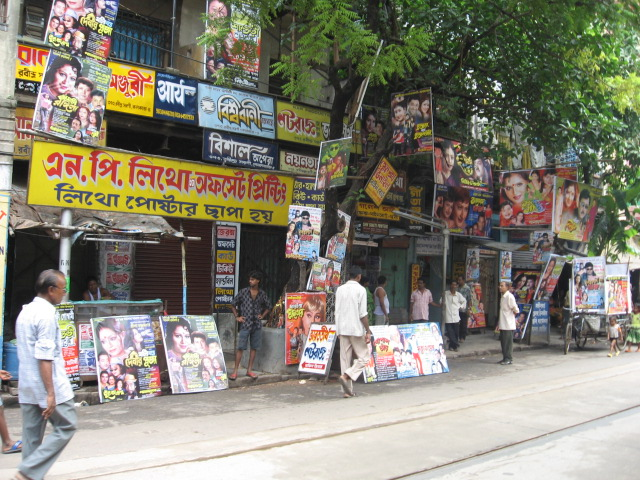
Posters adorn the offices of Jatra groups

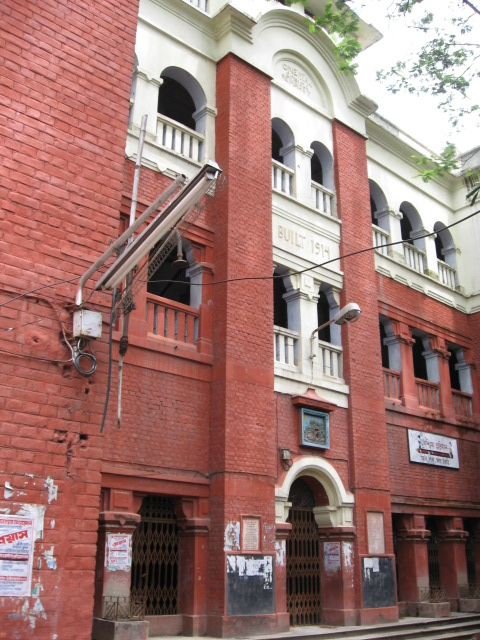
Oriental Seminary

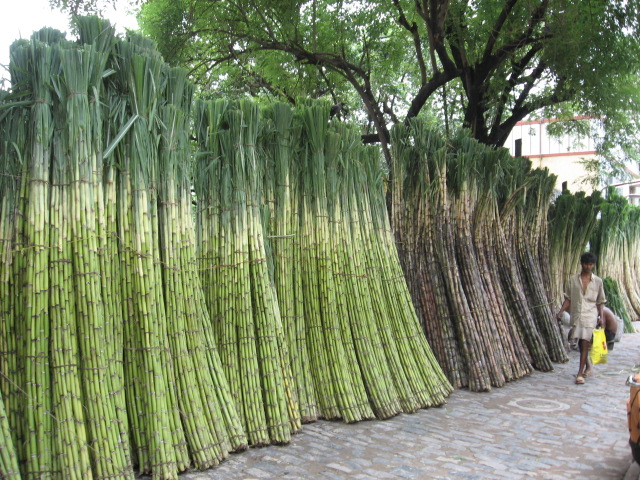
Sugar Cane for sale for Rath Yatra on a Jorasanko footpath

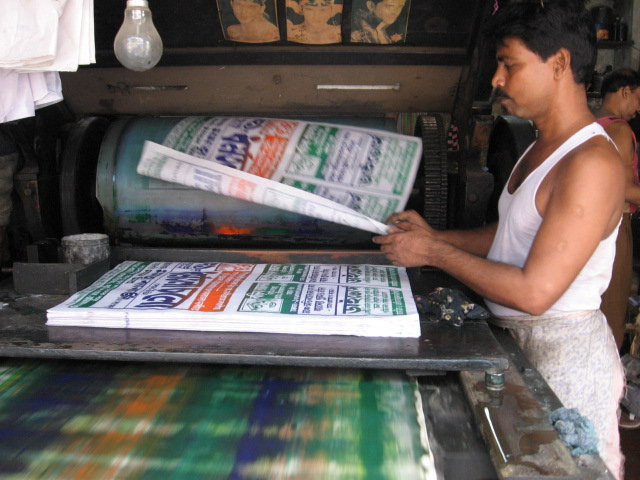
A litho printer at work – a Jorasanko speciality

== Notable people ==
- Radhanath Sikdar (1813-1870), mathematician known for calculating the height of Mount Everest
