= Vivek Gupta (politician) =

Indian politician

Member of Parliament, Rajya Sabha
- In office 3 April 2012 – 2 April 2018
- Succeeded by: Santunu Sen
- Constituency: West Bengal

Member of the West Bengal Legislative Assembly
- In office 2 May 2021 – 4 May 2026
- Preceded by: Smita Bakshi
- Constituency: Jorasanko

Personal details
- Born: 27 December 1975 (age 50) Kolkata
- Party: Trinamool Congress
- Spouse: Ruchika Gupta

Vivek Gupta (born December 1975) is MLA from Assembly Constituency Jorasakho of Trinamool Congress Party in West Bengal Election 2021. He was previously a Member of Parliament Rajya Sabha (2012–2018) representing Trinamool Congress Rajya Sabha members from West Bengal. He is the Managing Director & Chief group editor of SANMARG which is the leading Hindi daily in Eastern India. He is also state president of Trinamool Congress Hindi Cell West Bengal unit from 15 January 2023.

== Political career ==
He was nominated in the year May 2012 to Rajya Sabha from West Bengal. He has served as a member of Department Related Parliamentary Standing Committees (LS) committee on food, consumer affairs & Public Distribution in the year 2012.

He was a member of Department Related Parliamentary Standing Committees (RS) committee on Industry. He is since December 2012 onwards Member of the Indian Institute of Science Education and Research (IISERs) Council and since October 2013 onwards Member, National Platform for Disaster Risk Reduction.
