= Posta Ybycua =

- Location in Paraguay
- Coordinates: 25°24′39″S 57°28′6″W
- Country: Paraguay
- Department: Central Department
- District: Capiata

Posta Ybycua is a division (compañía) of the city Capiatá in Central Department, Paraguay. In 2009 a proposal was presented to the Chamber of Deputies of Paraguay to transform Posta Ybycua with 60,000 inhabitants in a municipality.
