= All India Federation of Tax Practitioners =

The All India Federation of Tax Practitioners (AIFTP) is an association of Advocates, Chartered Accountants and Tax Practitioners in India. The Federation was established in 1976. It includes 138 tax associations and 8900 individual members including leading senior advocates and Chartered Accountants. It is an association formed by those who perform as taxation law practitioners of India. The body was an initiative of Nanabhoy Palkhivala Its head office is in Mumbai.

== Memberships ==
AIFTP is a member of Asia Oceania Tax Consultants' Association (AOTCA).

== Directors ==
- National President: M. Srinivasa Rao; Tax Practitioner, Eluru, Andhra Pradesh
- Imm. Past President: Nikita Badheka, Advocate, Mumbai
- Dy. President: D. K. Gandhi, Advocate, Ghaziabad, Uttar Pradesh
- Vice Presidents:
  - O. P. Shukla, Advocate, Varanasi
  - Anand Pasari, Advocate, Ranchi
  - S. B. Kabra, Chartered Accountant, Secunderabad
  - Rajesh Mehta, Chartered Accountant, Indore
  - Janak Vaghani, Chartered Accountant, Mumbai
- Secretary General S. S. Satyanarayana; Tax Practitioner, Hyderabad, Andhra Pradesh
- National Treasurer Vijay Narayan Kewalramani, Chartered Accountant, Thane, India
