= Jorasanko Assembly constituency =

Legislative Assembly constituency in West Bengal, India

Jorasanko
- Constituency No. 165 for the West Bengal Legislative Assembly
- Interactive Map Outlining Jorasanko Assembly Constituency

Constituency details
- Country: India
- Region: East India
- State: West Bengal
- District: Kolkata
- Lok Sabha constituency: Kolkata Uttar
- Established: 1951
- Total electors: 197,906
- Reservation: None

Member of Legislative Assembly
- 18th West Bengal Legislative Assembly
- Incumbent Vijay Ojha
- Party: Bharatiya Janata Party
- Elected year: 2026

Jorasanko Assembly constituency is a Legislative Assembly constituency of Kolkata district in the Indian state of West Bengal.

== Overview ==
As per order of the Delimitation Commission in respect of the Delimitation of constituencies in the West Bengal, Jorasanko Assembly constituency is composed of the following:

- Ward Nos. 22, 23, 25, 27, 37, 38, 39, 40, 41, 42 and 43 of Kolkata Municipal Corporation.

Borough	Ward No.	Councillor	2021 Winner
IV	22	Meena Devi Purohit	Bharatiya Janata Party
IV	23	Vijay Ojha	Bharatiya Janata Party
IV	25	Rajesh Kumar Sinha	Trinamool Congress
IV	27	Meenakshi Gupta	Trinamool Congress
V	37	Soma Chaudhuri	Trinamool Congress
IV	38	Sadhana Bose	Trinamool Congress
IV	39	Mohammad Jasimuddin	Trinamool Congress
V	40	Suparna Dutta	Trinamool Congress
V	41	Reita Chowdhury	Trinamool Congress
V	42	Mahesh Kumar Sharma	Trinamool Congress
V	43	Ayesha Kaniz	Trinamool Congress

Jorasanko Assembly constituency is part of No. 24 Kolkata Uttar Lok Sabha constituency.

== Members of the Legislative Assembly ==
Year	Name	Party
1952	Amarendra Nath Basu	All India Forward Bloc
1957	Anandi Lal Poddar	Indian National Congress
1962	Badri Prasad Poddar	Indian National Congress
1967	R. K. Poddar	Indian National Congress
1969	Deokinandan Poddar	Indian National Congress
1971	Deokinandan Poddar	Indian National Congress
1972	Deokinandan Poddar	Indian National Congress
1977	Vishnu Kant Shastri	Janata Party
1982	Deokinandan Poddar	Indian National Congress
1987	Deokinandan Poddar	Indian National Congress
1991	Deokinandan Poddar	Indian National Congress
1996	Deokinandan Poddar	Indian National Congress
2001	Satya Narain Bajaj	Trinamool Congress
2006	Dinesh Bajaj	Trinamool Congress
2011	Smita Bakshi	Trinamool Congress
2016	Smita Bakshi	Trinamool Congress
2021	Vivek Gupta	Trinamool Congress
2026	Vijay Ojha	Bharatiya Janata Party

== Election results ==
=== 2026 ===
2026 West Bengal Legislative Assembly election: Jorasanko
Party	Candidate	Votes	%	±%
BJP	Vijay Ojha	52,868	49.48	▲9.68
AITC	Vijay Upadhyay	47,071	44.05	▼8.62
CPI(M)	Bharat Ram Tiwari	4,108	3.84	
INC	Deepak Singh	1,111	1.04	▼3.78
NOTA	None of the above	672	0.63	▼0.41
Majority		5,797	5.43	▼7.44
Turnout		106,847	87.05	▲37.06
BJP gain from AITC		Swing		

=== 2021 ===
2021 West Bengal Legislative Assembly election: Jorasanko
Party	Candidate	Votes	%	±%
AITC	Vivek Gupta	52,123	52.67	
BJP	Meena Devi Purohit	39,380	39.8	
INC	Janab Ajmal Khan	4,769	4.82	
NOTA	None of the above	1,028	1.04	
Majority		12,743	12.87	
Turnout		98,955	49.99	
AITC hold		Swing		

=== 2016 ===
2016 West Bengal Legislative Assembly election: Jorasanko
Party	Candidate	Votes	%	±%
AITC	Smita Bakshi	44,766	42.79	−8.32
BJP	Rahul Sinha	38,476	36.77	+21.64
RJD	Avinash Kumar Agarwal	15,639	14.95	New
NOTA	None of the above	2,374	2.27	New
BSP	Uttam Mali	816	0.78	
Majority		6,290	6.02	−21.76
Turnout		1,04,630	53.72	−2.03
AITC hold		Swing		

=== 2011 ===
2011 West Bengal Legislative Assembly election: Jorasanko
Party	Candidate	Votes	%	±%
AITC	Smita Bakshi	57,981	51.11	
CPI(M)	Janki Singh	26,461	23.33	
BJP	Meena Devi Purohit	17,161	15.13	
JD(U)	Mohammad Sohrab	8,526	7.52	
Majority		31,520	27.78	
Turnout		1,13,419	55.75	
AITC win (new seat)				

=== 2006 ===
2006 West Bengal Legislative Assembly election: Jorasanko
Party	Candidate	Votes	%	±%
AITC	Dinesh Bajaj	14,162	41.24	
AIFB	Shyam Sundar Gupta	13,343	38.85	
INC	Monoj Kumar Poddar	5,561	16.19	
IND	Vijay Gupta	270	0.79	
IND	Chanchal Kumar Datta	236	0.69	
IND	Sachin Sharma	228	0.66	
IND	Bindhyachal Ojha	175	0.51	
IND	Swapan Bose	159	0.46	
IND	Kashinath Kundu	101	0.29	
IND	Dipak Sharma	60	0.17	
IND	Ganesh Mondal	46	0.13	
Majority		819	2.39	
Turnout		34,341		
AITC hold		Swing		

=== 2001 ===
2001 West Bengal Legislative Assembly election: Jorasanko
Party	Candidate	Votes	%	±%
AITC	Satya Narayan Bajaj	14,847	38.96	
AIFB	Shyam Sundar Gupta	14,069	36.92	
BJP	Manoj Kumar Poddar	8,079	21.20	
IND	Virendra Kumar Luhariwala	318	0.83	
SJP(R)	Sitaram Sharma	232	0.61	
IND	Ravi Kumar Sanker	160	0.42	
IND	Ravi Jaipuria	114	0.30	
IND	Abhoy Sankar Roy	81	0.21	
IND	Radhyashyam Ringheshya	61	0.16	
IND	Manoj Seth	39	0.10	
IND	Naresh Chandra Sharma	39	0.10	
IND	Khalid Irfan	35	0.09	
IND	Madanlal Agarwal	30	0.08	
Majority		778	2.04	
Turnout		38,107	46.58	
Swing to AITC from INC		Swing		

=== 1957 ===
1957 West Bengal Legislative Assembly election: Jorasanko
Party	Candidate	Votes	%	±%
INC	Anandilall Poddar	16,090	59.76	
AIFB	Nalini Kanta Guha	10,152	37.70	
IND	Banwari Lall Dalmia	683	2.54	
Majority		5,938	22.06	
Turnout		26,925	51.45	
Swing to INC from AIFB		Swing		

=== 1952 ===
1952 West Bengal Legislative Assembly election: Jorasanko
Party	Candidate	Votes	%	±%
AIFB	Amarendra Nath Basu	14,983	62.59	
INC	Bhagwati Prasad Khaitan	7,501	31.34	
IND	Lakshman Prasad	455	1.90	
IND	Amar Nath Chatterjee	382	1.60	
IND	Jitendra Kumar Basu	367	1.53	
Socialist	Parimal Chandra	250	1.04	
Majority		7,482	31.25	
Turnout		23,938	41.34	
AIFB win (new seat)				
