= Burra Bazar railway station =

Railway station in West Bengal, India

Burra Bazar

General information
- Location: Burrabazar, Kolkata, West Bengal; India
- Coordinates: 22.589269°N 88.350971°E
- Elevation: 4 metres (13 ft)
- System: Kolkata Suburban Railway station
- Owner: Indian Railways
- Operator: Eastern Railway
- Platforms: 1
- Tracks: 1
- Connections: Jagannath Ghat

Construction
- Structure type: At Ground, Single-track railway
- Parking: Not available
- Cycle facilities: Not available
- Accessible: Not available

Other information
- Status: Functioning
- Station code: BZB
- Zone(s): Eastern Railway
- Division(s): Sealdah

History
- Opened: 1984; 42 years ago
- Electrified: 1984; 42 years ago
Services
Preceding station	Kolkata Suburban Railway	Following station
Sovabazar Ahiritola towards Dum Dum Junction	Circular Line	B.B.D. Bag towards Dum Dum Junction
Route map
Location

Burra Bazar railway station is a Kolkata Suburban Railway station in Burrabazar, Kolkata. It serves the local areas of Burrabazar and M.G. Road in Kolkata, West Bengal, India. The station has one platform only. Its station code is BZB.

== Station ==
=== Complex ===
The platform is not very well sheltered. The station lacks many facilities including water and sanitation. There is no proper approach road to this station.

=== Layout ===
G	Street level	Exit/Entrance & ticket counter
P1	Side platform, No-1 doors will open on the left/right
P1	Track 1	Sovabazar Ahiritola ← toward → B.B.D Bag

== See also ==
- North 24 Parganas district
- Indian Railways
- Sealdah railway station
- Kolkata Suburban Railway
- Trams in Kolkata
- Dum Dum Cantonment railway station
- Transport in West Bengal
- List of railway stations in India
