= Belgachia metro station =

Metro station in Kolkata, India

Belgachia
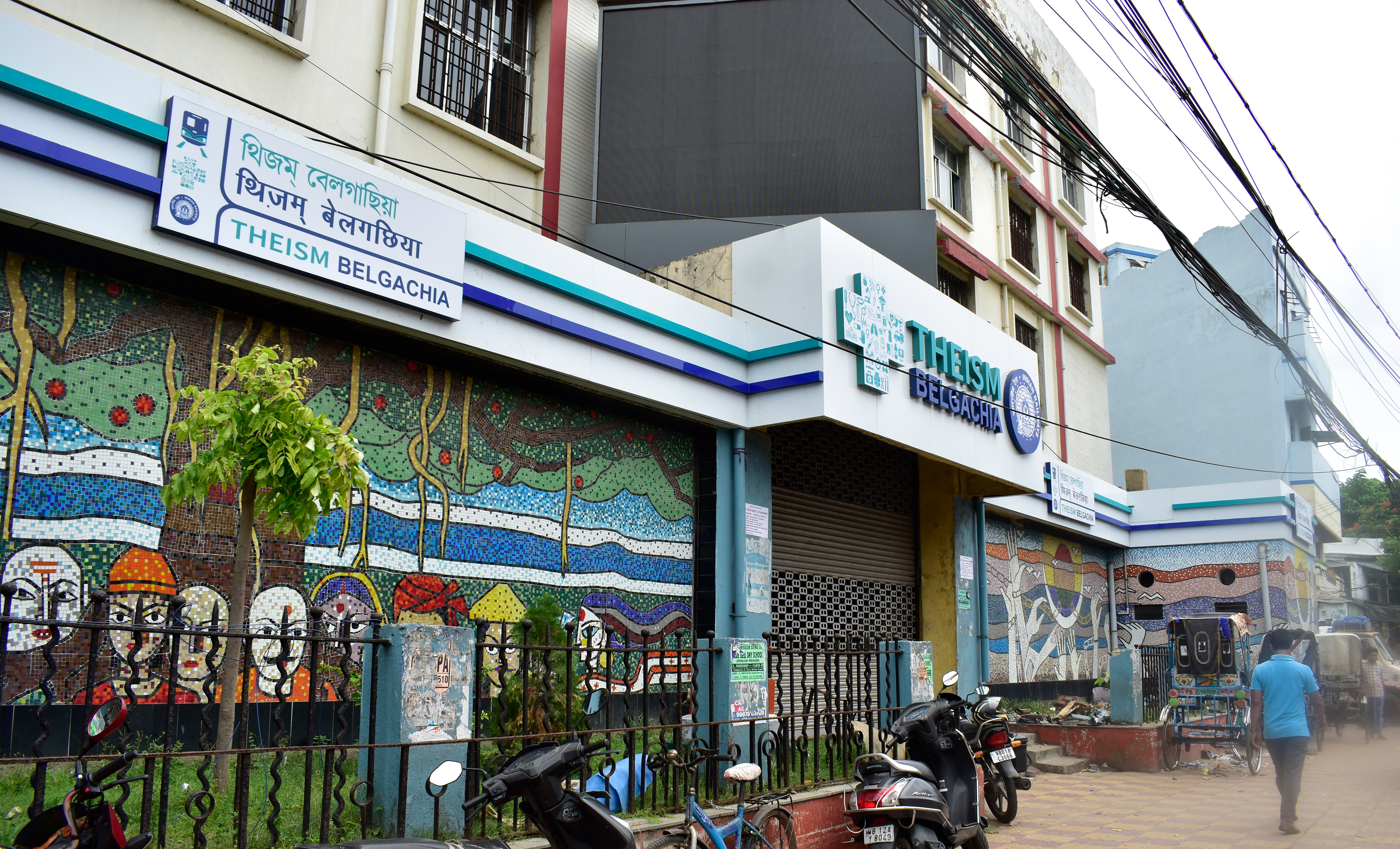
- Belgachia Metro Station Gate 1

General information
- Other names: Theism Belgachia
- Location: Belgachia Rd, Belgachia; Kolkata, West Bengal 700037; India
- Coordinates: 22.60599°N 88.38637°E
- System: Kolkata Metro
- Operator: Metro Railway, Kolkata
- Line: Blue Line
- Platforms: 2 (1 island platform)

Construction
- Structure type: Underground
- Accessible: No

Other information
- Station code: KBEL

History
- Opened: 12 November 1984; 41 years ago

Services
Preceding station	Kolkata Metro	Following station
Dum Dum towards Dakshineswar	Blue Line	Shyambazar towards Shahid Khudiram
Route map
Location

Belgachia (also known as Theism Belgachia for sponsorship reasons) is an underground metro station on the North-South corridor of the Blue Line of Kolkata Metro in Belgachia, Kolkata, West Bengal, India.

== History ==
Belgachia Station was commissioned by the Kolkata Metro as part of the first transit line of the metro system, commonly known as the North-South corridor. The station was the penultimate stop before Dum Dum, which, until the opening of the Noapara stop, was the terminal station on the railway system. The station became the first underground station on the northern side and continues to be one of the shallowest, lying at a depth of only 5 metres below Belgachia Road.

As part of the drive to increase non-fare revenue of the Kolkata Metro, the station was leased for branding and semi-naming rights to Kolkata-based conglomerate, Theism Group, rebranding it as Theism Belgachia officially. It was redecorated and rebranded by the corporate organization to become India's first health station.

== Station layout ==
G	Street level	Exit/Entrance
L1	Mezannine	Fare control, station agent, Ticket/token, Theism Diagnostics kiosk
L2	Platform 2	Towards Shahid Khudiram (Shyambazar) →
L2	Island platform, Doors will open on the right
L2	Platform 1	← Towards Dakshineswar (Dum Dum)

== Entry/Exit ==
- 1 – Duttabagan Milk Colony
- 2 – CTC (WBTC) Depot
- 3 – West Bengal University of Animal & Fishery Sciences

== Connections ==
=== Auto ===
Autos ply on Belgachia-Lake Town and Belgachia-Bangur Avenue routes.

=== Bus ===
Bus route number 3B, 3C/1, 3D, D-36, D-36A, 30C, 30D, 47B, 79B, 91, 91A, 93, 211A, 215/1, 219, 219/1, 227, KB16, AC40, DN18 etc. serve the station.

=== Train ===
Kolkata railway station, Patipukur railway station and Tala railway station are located nearby.

== Gallery ==
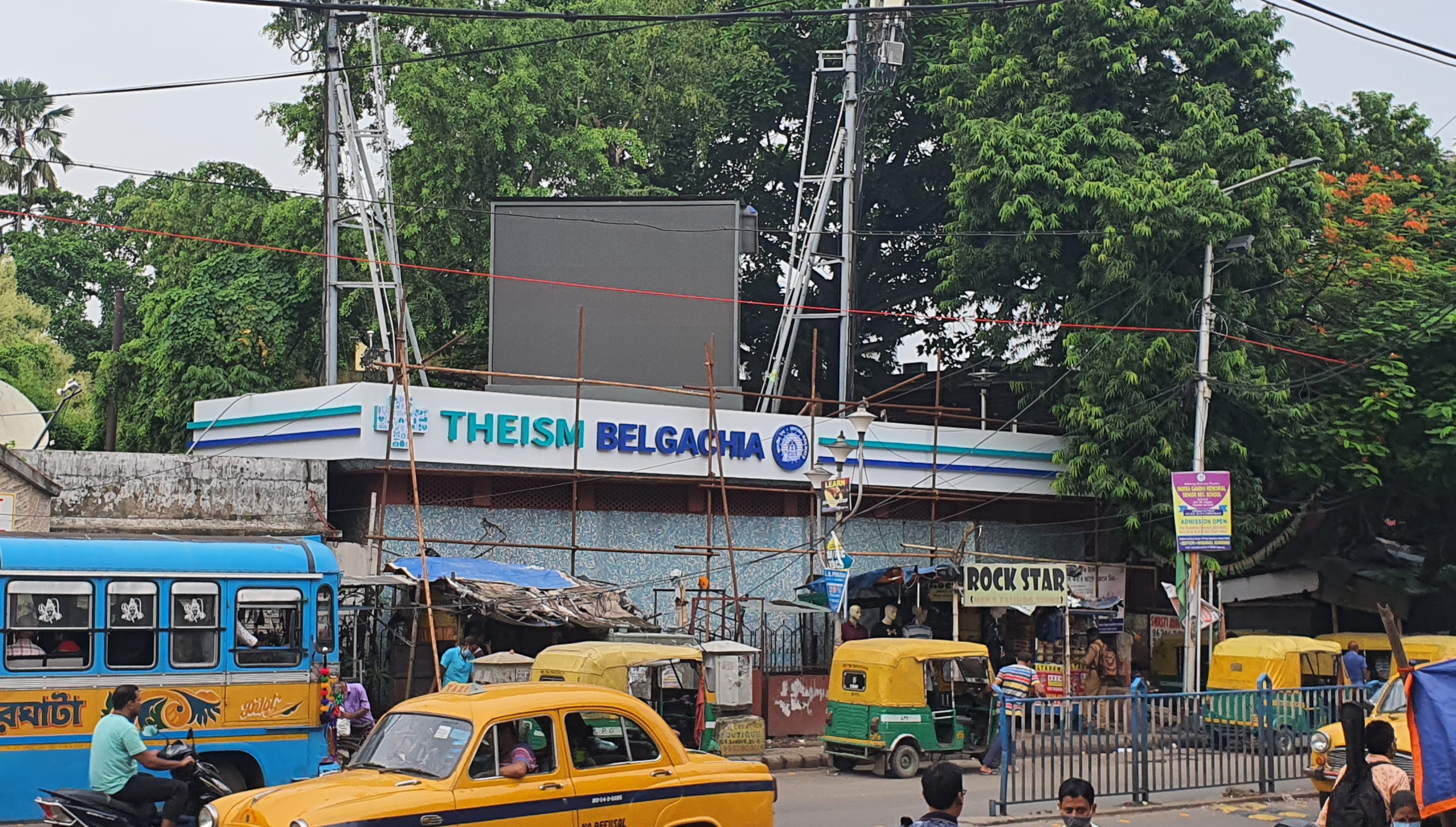
Belgachia Metro Station Gate 3

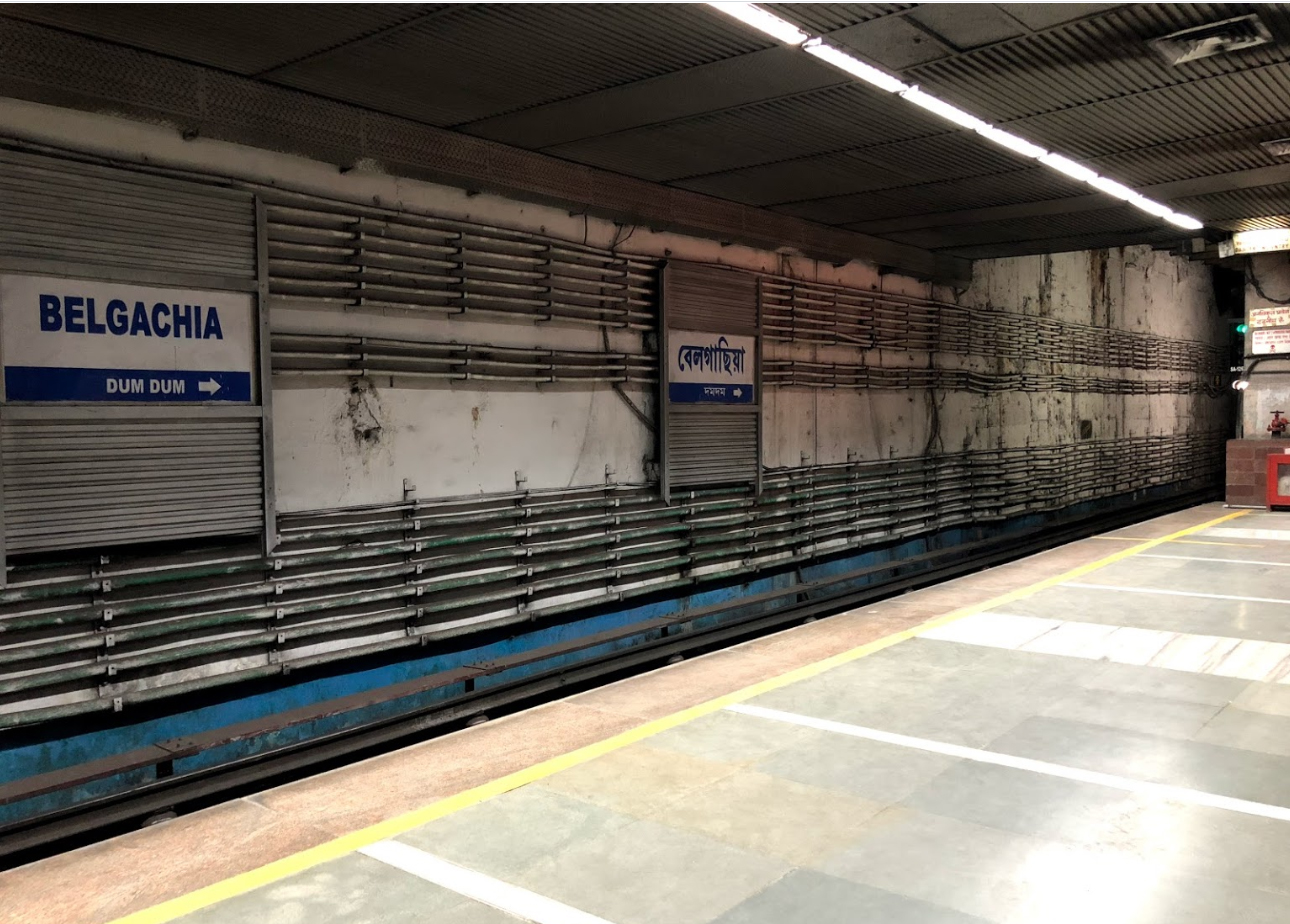
Belgachia Dum Dum bound platform

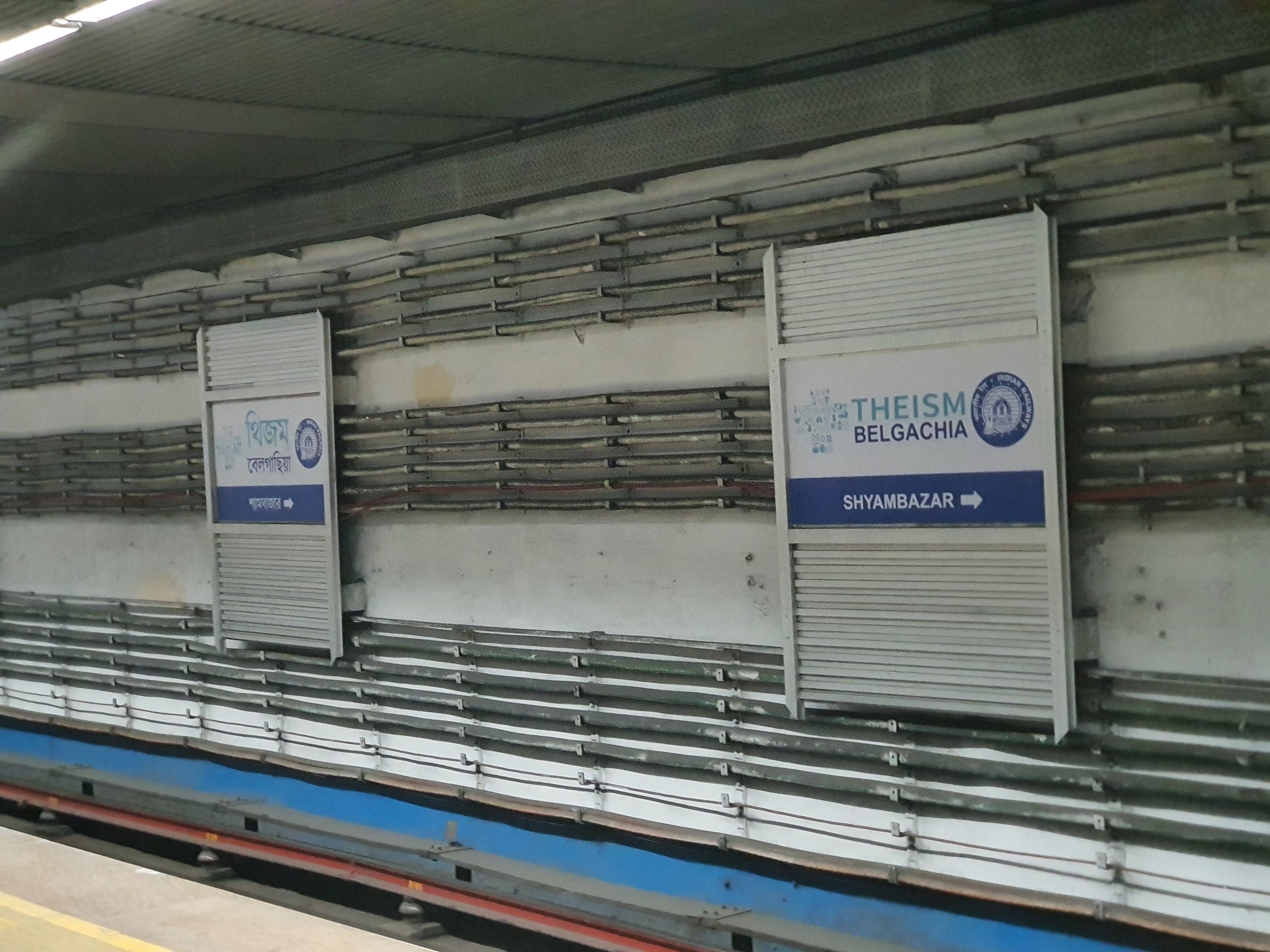
Shyambazar bound tracks at Belgachia

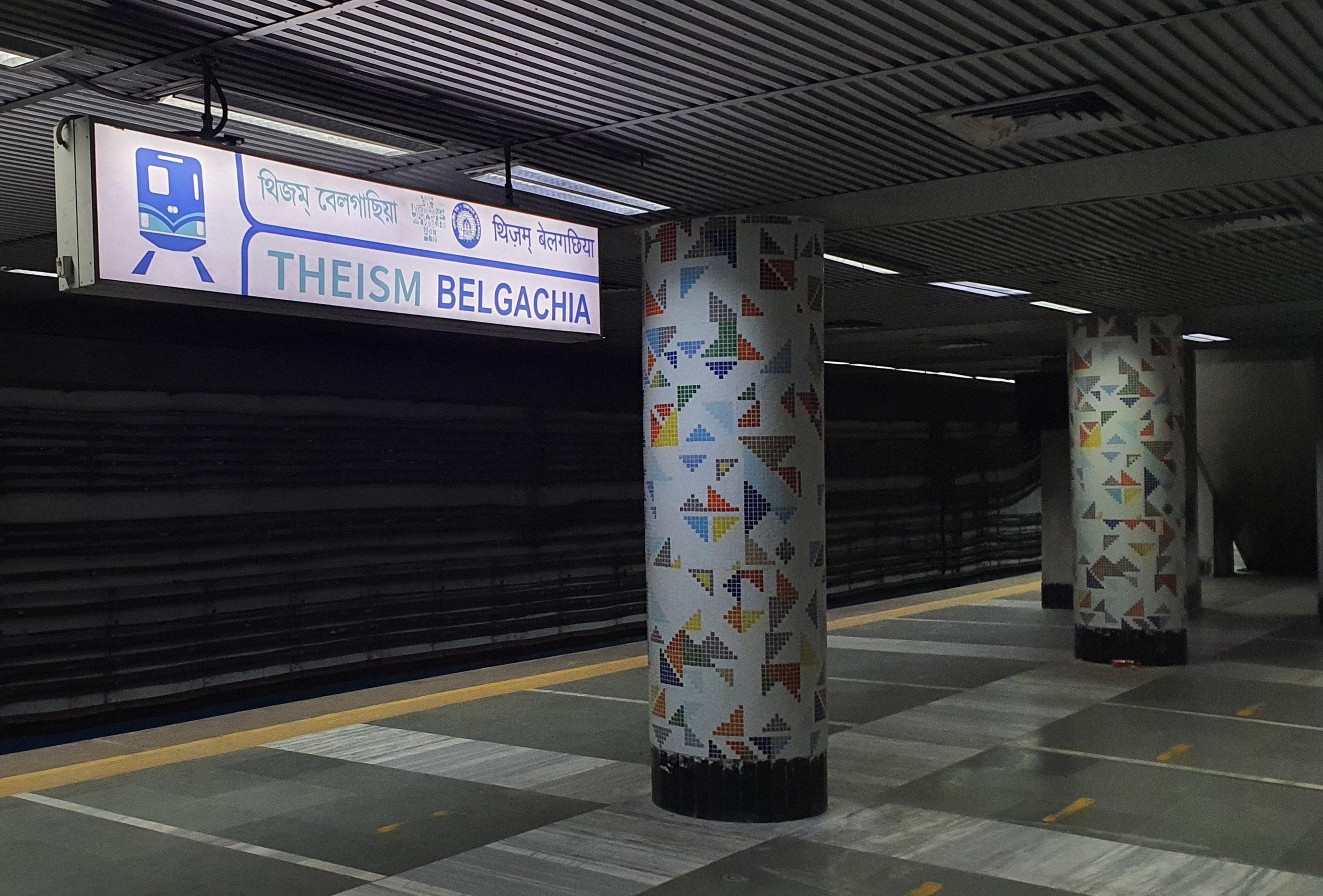
A view of the platform naming board at Belgachia

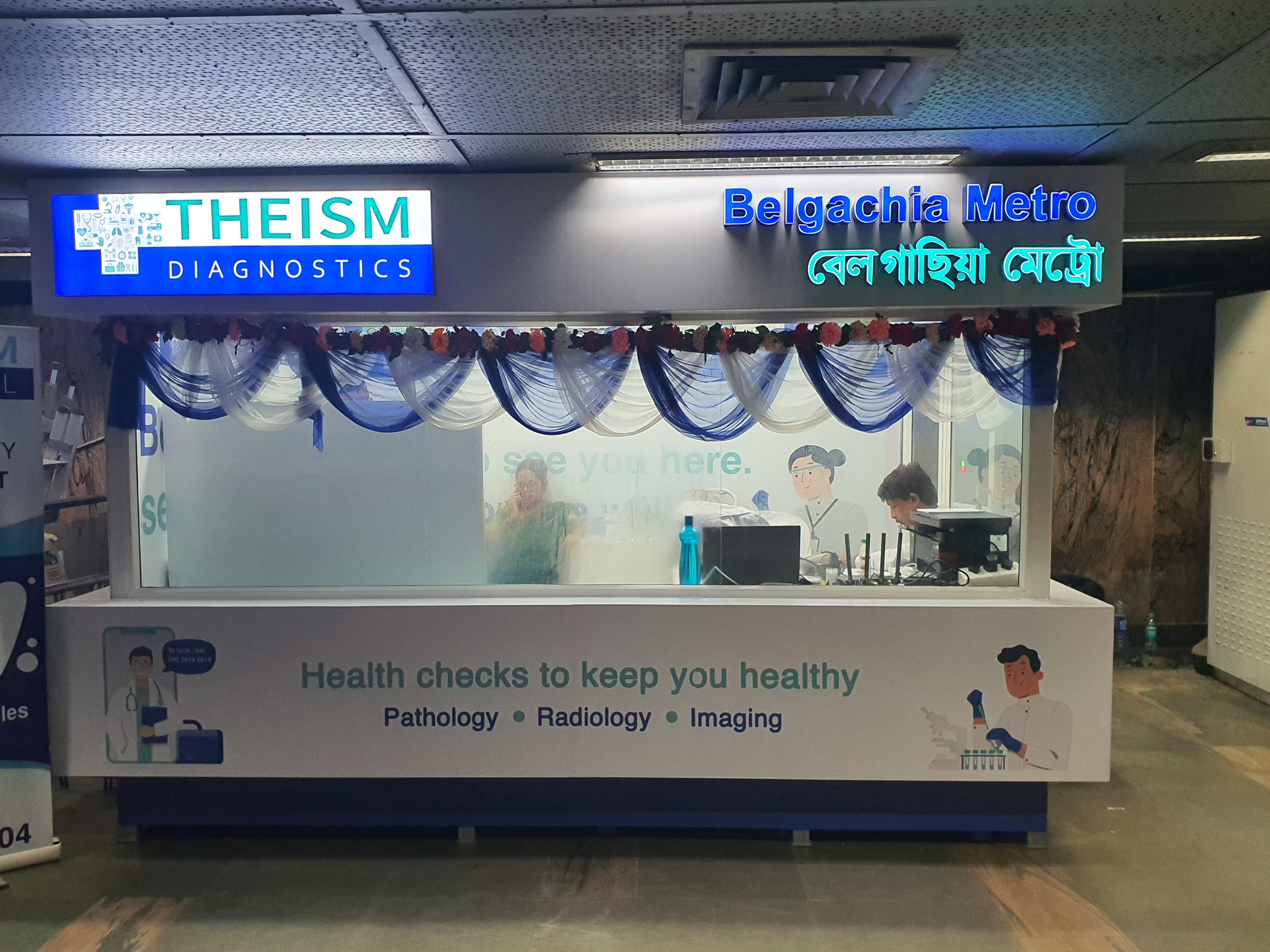
Theism Diagnostics Kiosk at Belgachia

== See also ==
- Kolkata
- List of Kolkata Metro stations
- Transport in Kolkata
- Kolkata Metro Rail Corporation
- Kolkata Suburban Railway
- Kolkata Monorail
- Trams in Kolkata
- Belgachia
- List of rapid transit systems
- List of metro systems
