= Transport in Kolkata =

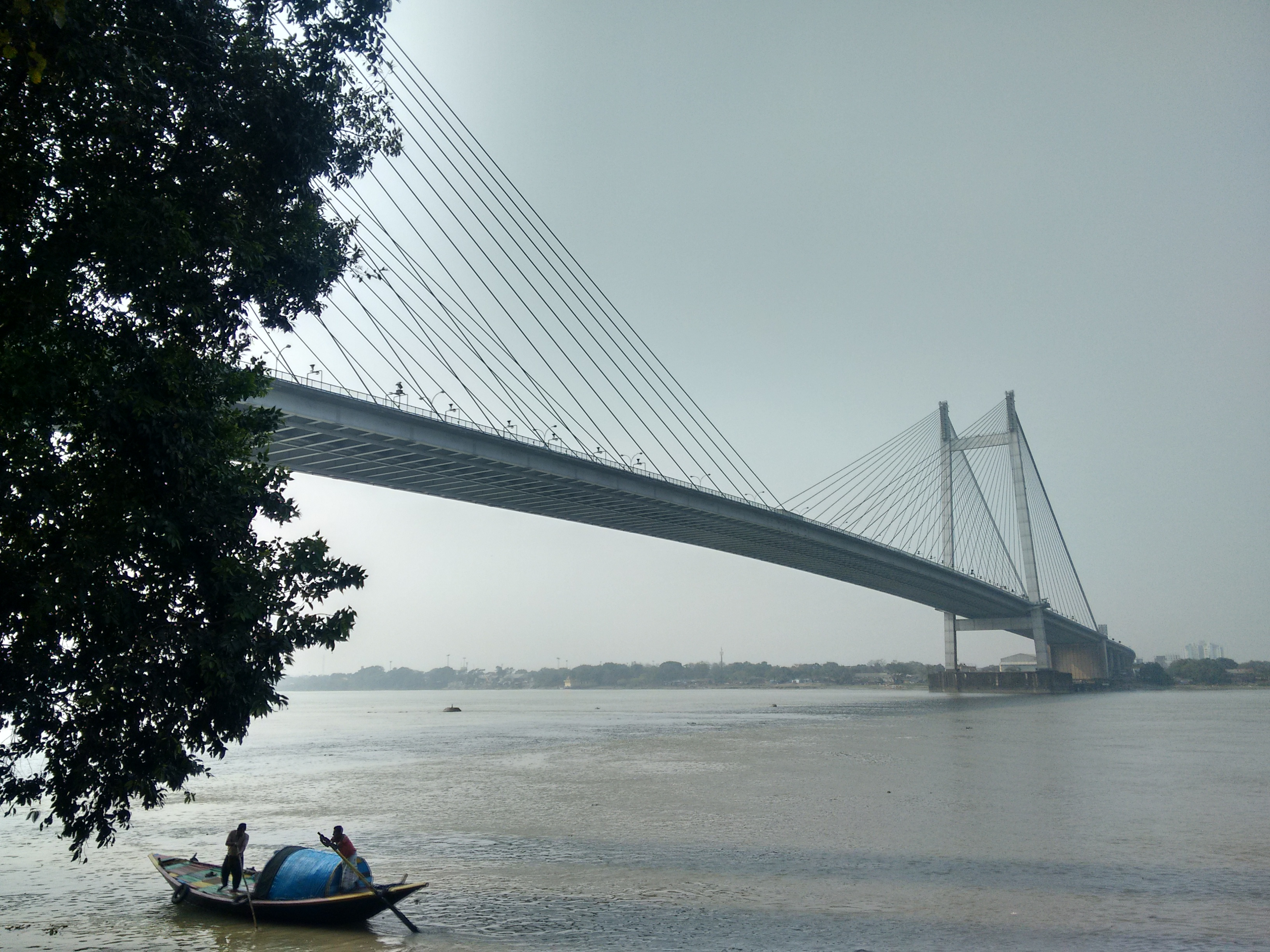
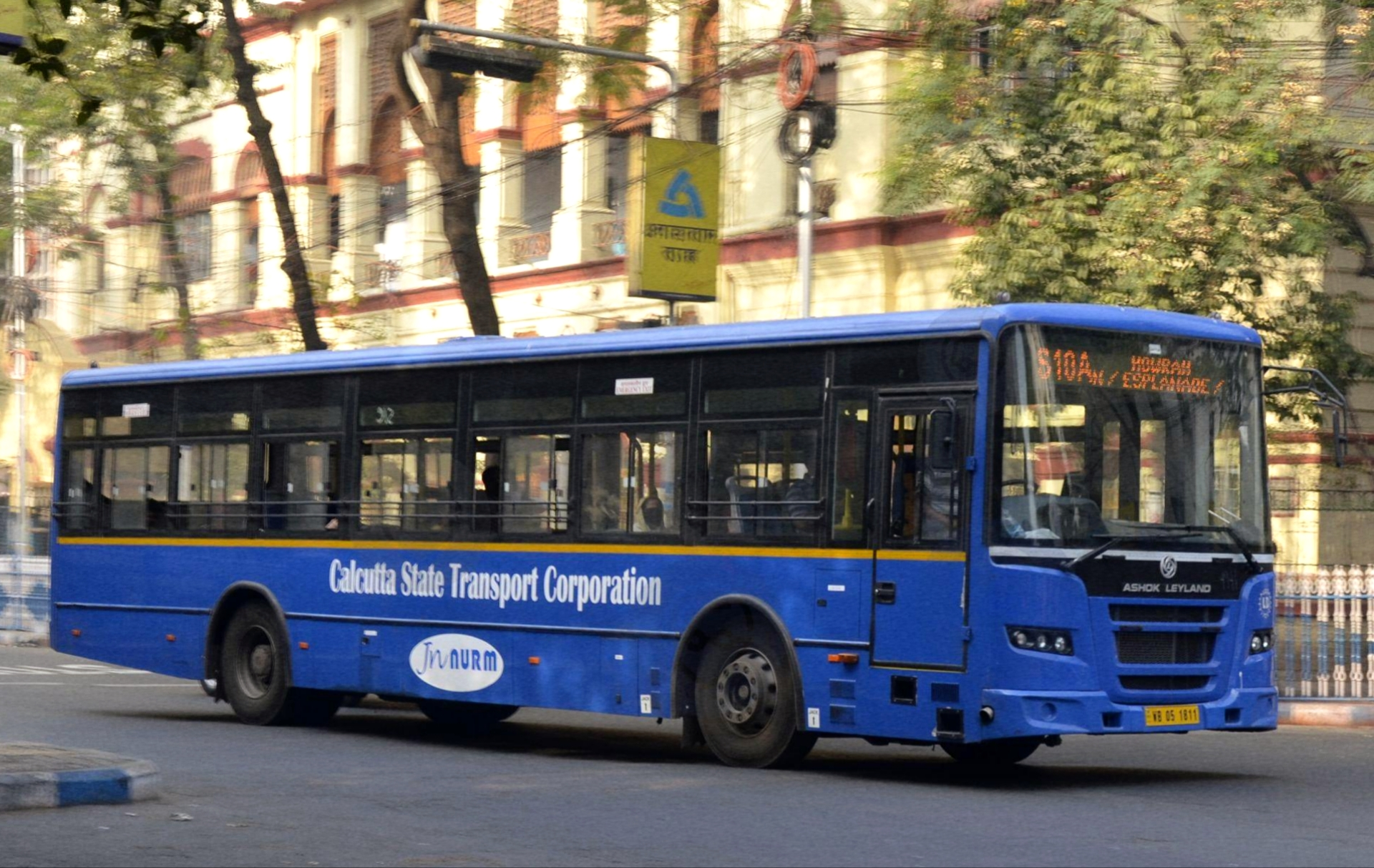
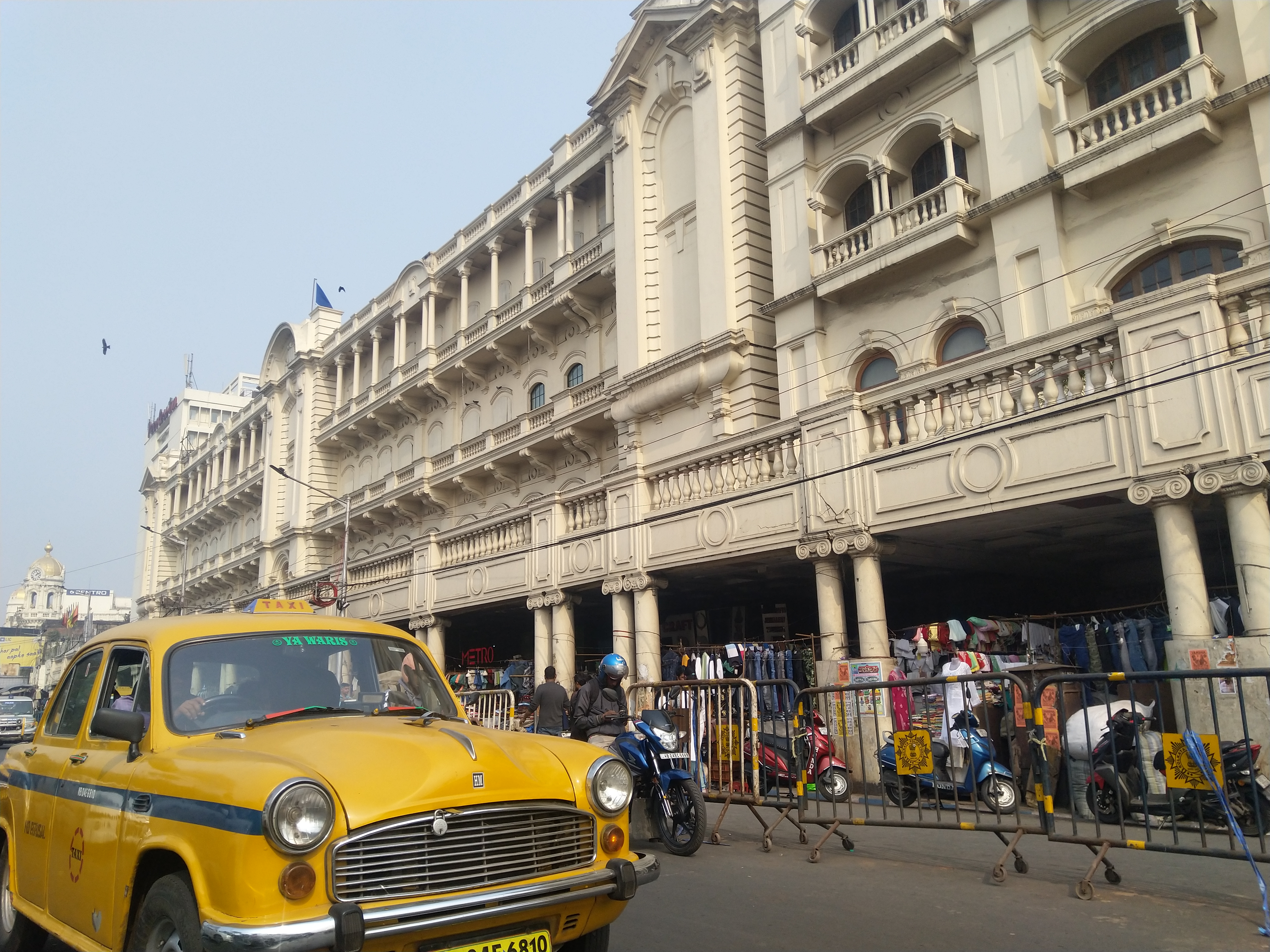
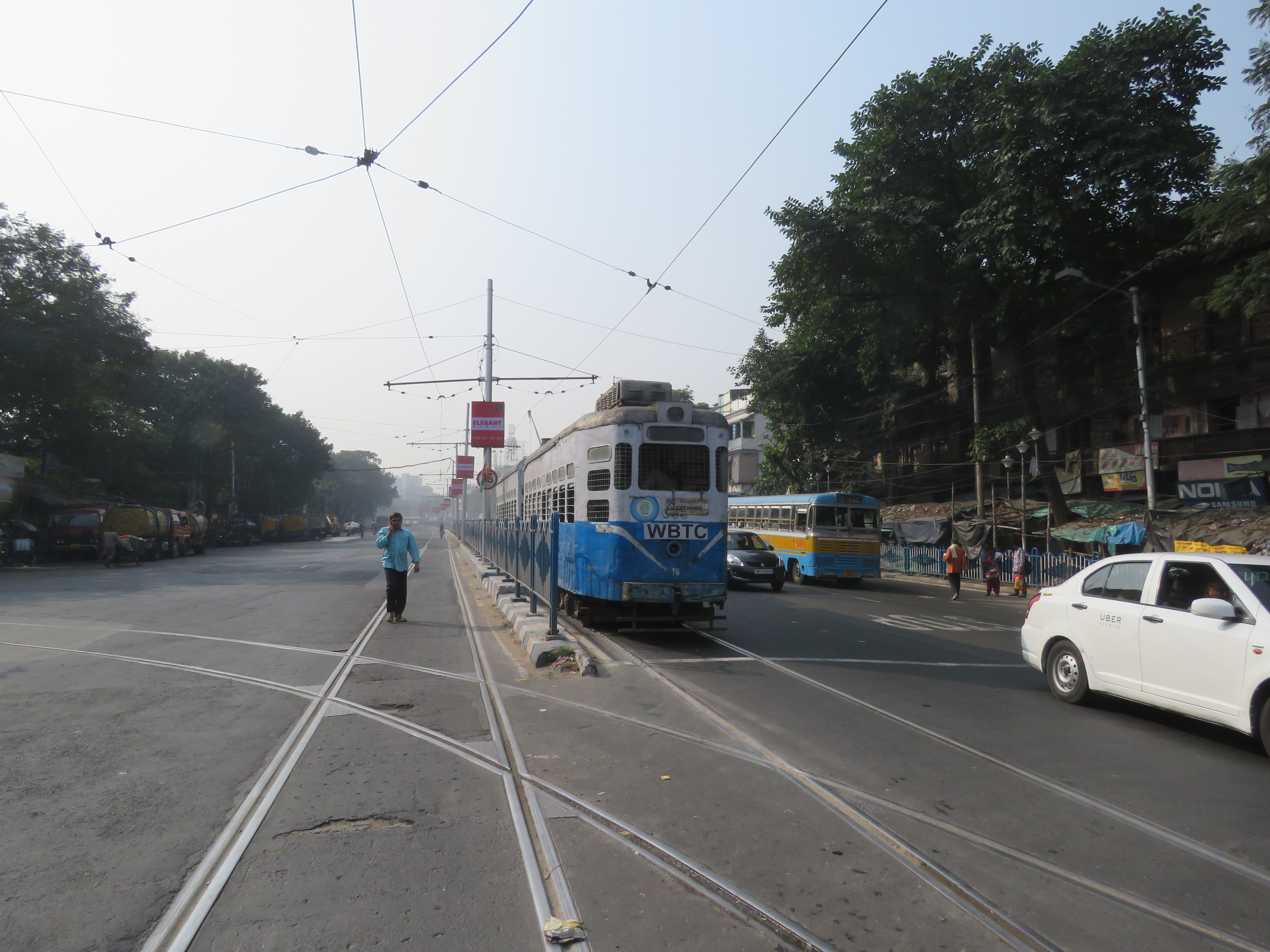
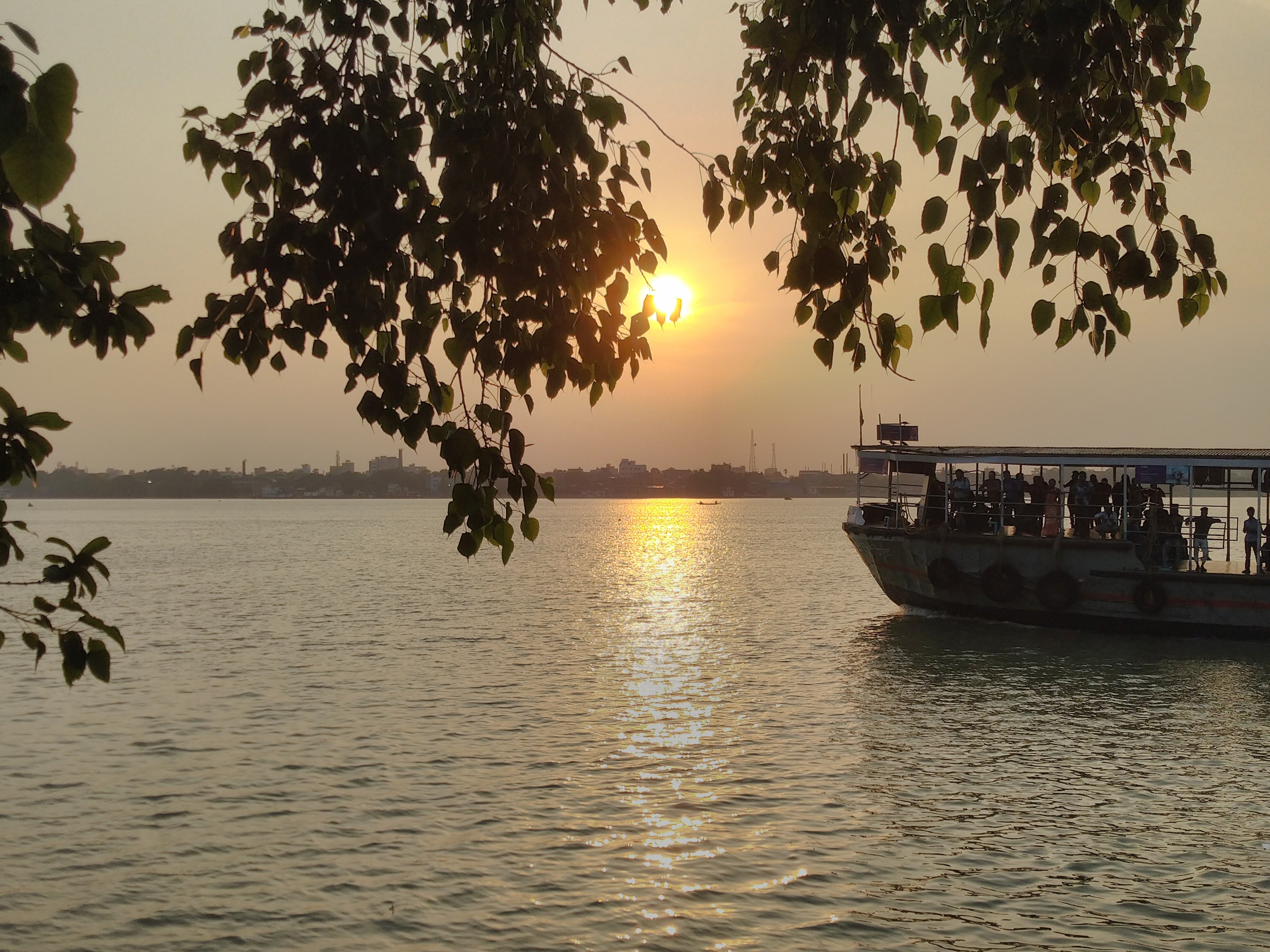
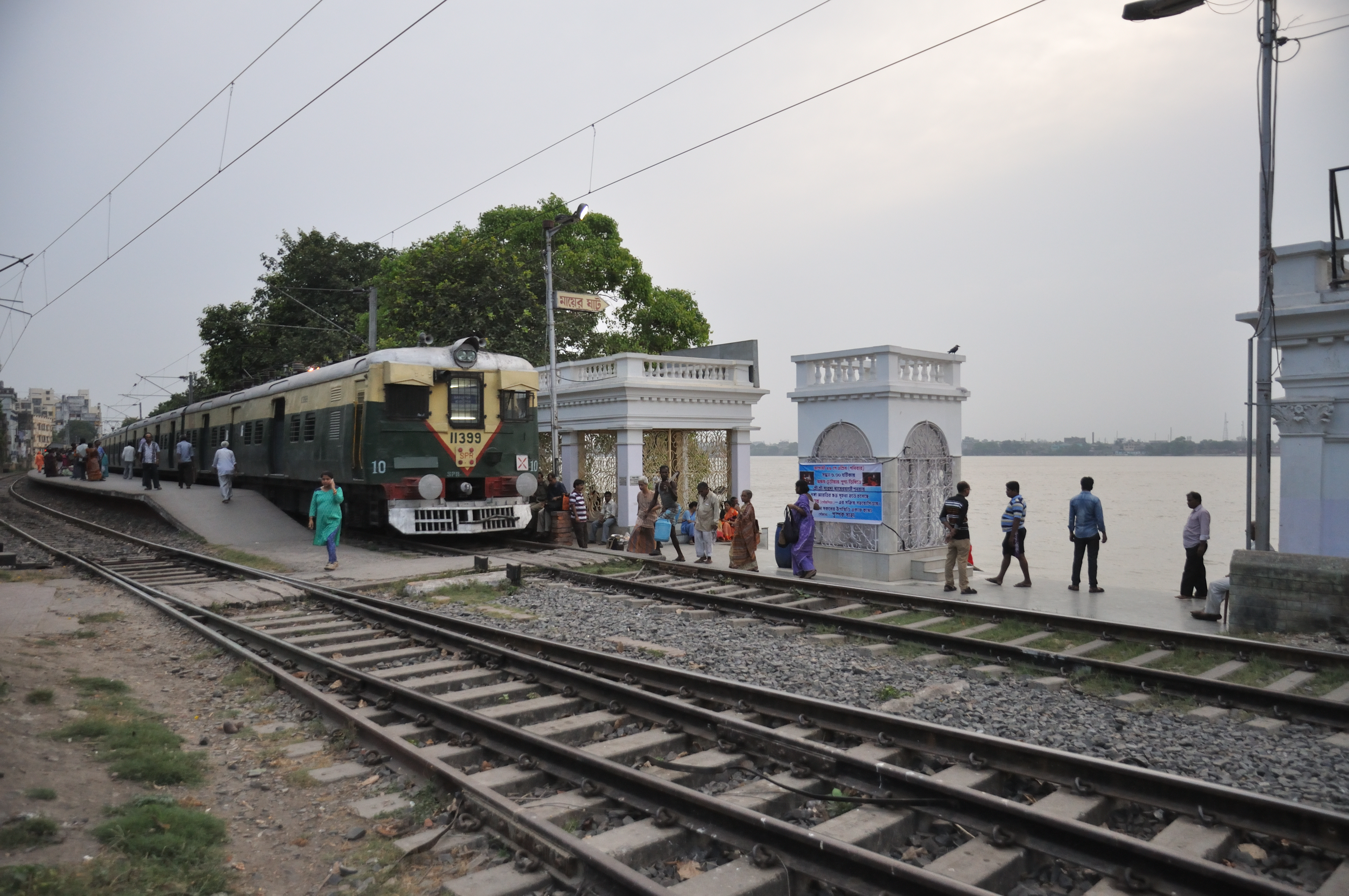
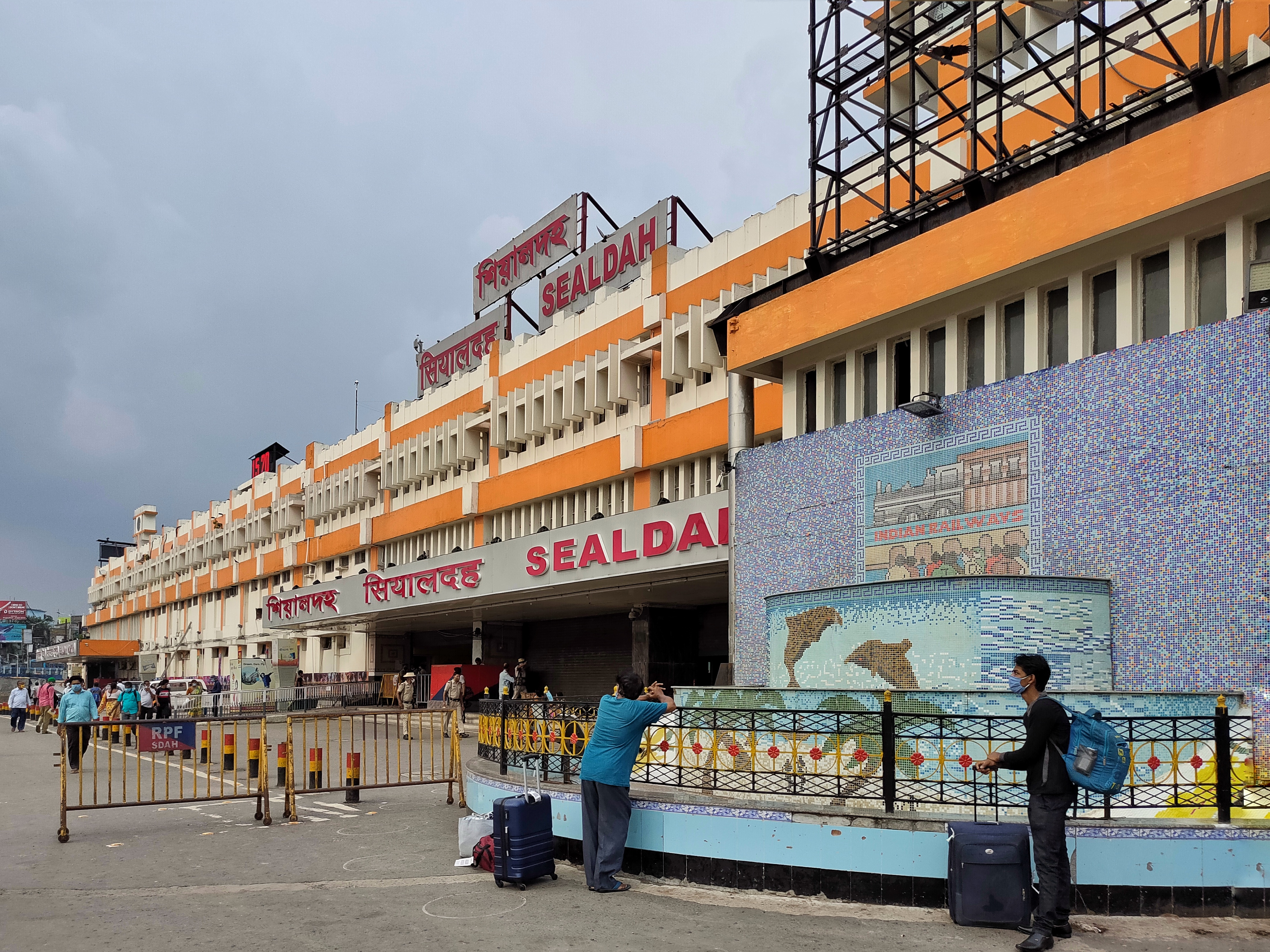
- Vidyasagar Setu, Connecting Kolkata & Howrah A non air-conditioned WBTC city bus The iconic Yellow Taxi of Kolkata A Tram standing in traffic A Ferry Vessel in Hooghly River during Sunset A Local Train of Kolkata Suburban Railway The Sealdah railway station, biggest transportation hub in the city

Overview
- Owner: Indian Railways (Metro and suburban railways); West Bengal Transport Corporation (Bus, Tram and ferry services)
- Area served: Kolkata Metropolitan Region, India
- Locale: Kolkata, West Bengal, India
- Transit type: Rapid transit, Commuter rail, Tram, Bus, Taxicab and Ferry

Operation
- Operators: Kolkata Metro: Metro Railway, Kolkata & Kolkata Metro Rail Corporation; Kolkata Suburban Railway: Eastern Railway & South Eastern Railway; Bus, Tram and Ferry services: West Bengal Transport Corporation
System map

Kolkata the Capital of the Indian state of West Bengal has a good transportation system. Kolkata's transport system is diverse, with a mix of modern and traditional modes of transport catering to the city's large population.

Kolkata’s transport infrastructure is continually evolving, with the metro expansions aimed at addressing the growing demand for public transport.

== Roads ==
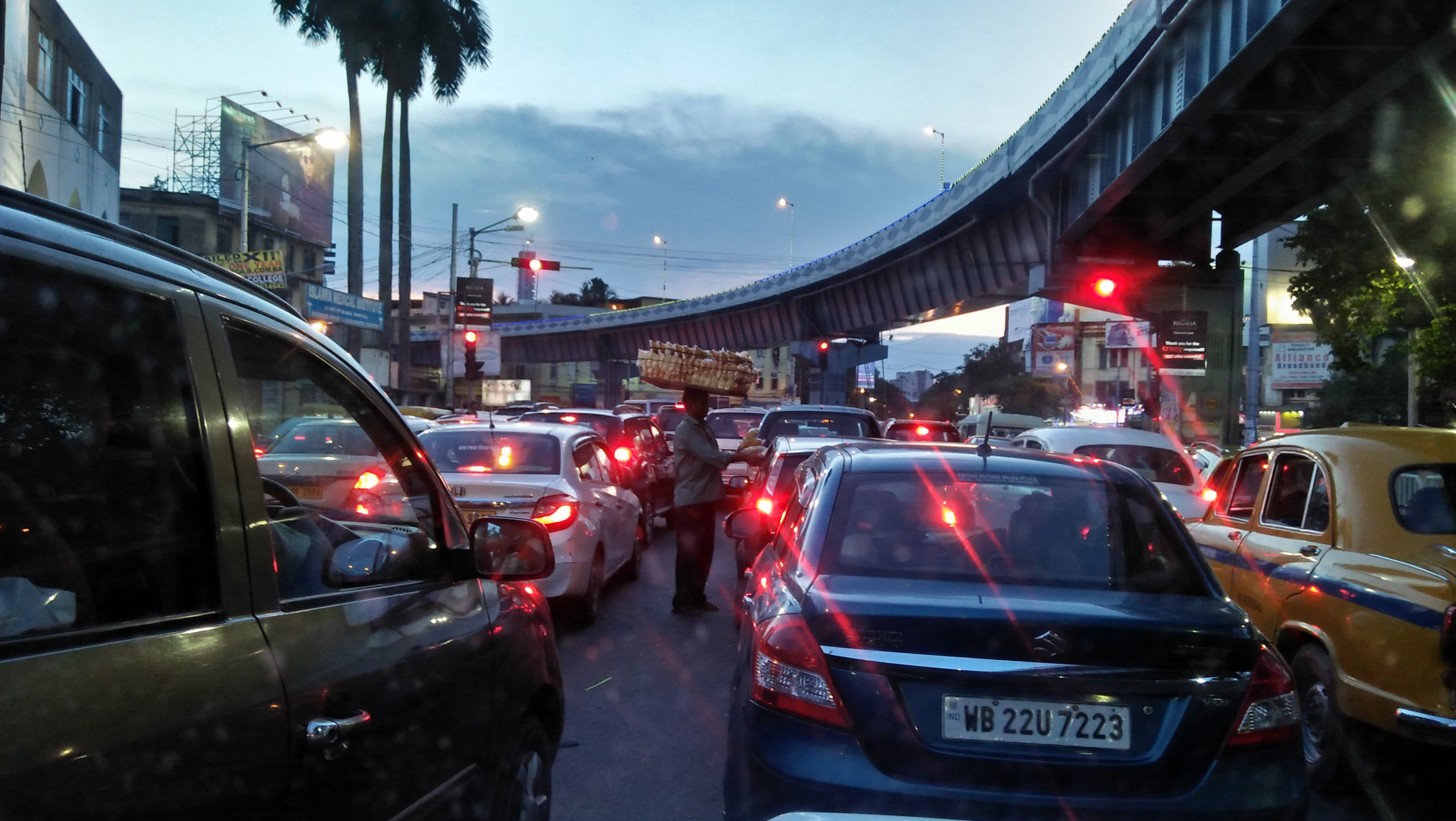
Traffic Of Kolkata

=== Major roads in Kolkata city ===
Major North–South corridors in Kolkata (city proper) are:

- Chittaranjan Avenue–Chowringhee Road–Shyama Prasad Mukherjee Road–Mahanayak Uttam Kumar Sarani: A 4–8 laned road from Shyambazar 5-point crossing (North end) to Tollygunge (South end)
- APC Road–AJC Bose Road–Gariahat Road–Raja SC Mullick Road: A 6–8 laned road up to Jadavpur and then 2–4 laned road starting from Shyambazar 5-point crossing (North end) to Garia (South end)
- Eastern Metropolitan Bypass: A 8–10 laned road from Ultadanga to Sonarpur

A number of East–West corridors works as connector between the roads:

- AJC Bose Road–JBS Haldane Avenue: A 4–6 laned road from Hastings to Science City
- Rashbehari Avenue: A 4–6 laned road from Kalighat to Ruby
- Prince Anwar Shah Road–Kalikapur Road: A 4–6 laned road from Tollygunge to Kalikapur on EM Bypass
- MG Road: A 4 laned road from Howrah Bridge to Sealdah

=== Bridges ===
Howrah Bridge (also known as Rabindra Setu) and Vidyasagar Setu (also known as Second Hooghly Bridge) are two bridges connecting Kolkata with Howrah over the Ganges. Bally Bridge (also known as Vivekandanda Setu) is the third bridge over the river at the northern reach of the city near Dakshineswar from Howrah.It is a road cum rail bridge. The fourth and the newest one is Nivedita Setu which is a toll bridge beside Vivekananda Setu.

=== Major roads in KMA ===
Since Kolkata suffers from traffic congestion like other Indian cities, a network of expressways like Kona Expressway, Kalyani Expressway, Belghoria Expressway, flyovers and widening of southern stretch of Eastern Metropolitan Bypass are being created to ease up road traffic. Maa Flyover is an important flyover in Kolkata.

A large network of roads are spread over in Kolkata which helps to reduce traffic congestion. Elevated roads are present in New Town and Rajarhat area of Kolkata. Kolkata is connected to other parts of India by the National Highways 2, 6, 34, and 117. The Belghoria Expressway connects NH 34 with NH 2 and 6 via the Nivedita Setu while the NH 117 is connected to NH 6 by the Kona Expressway via the Vidyasagar Setu.

== Railways ==
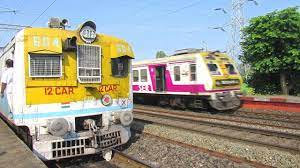
SER Local Trains

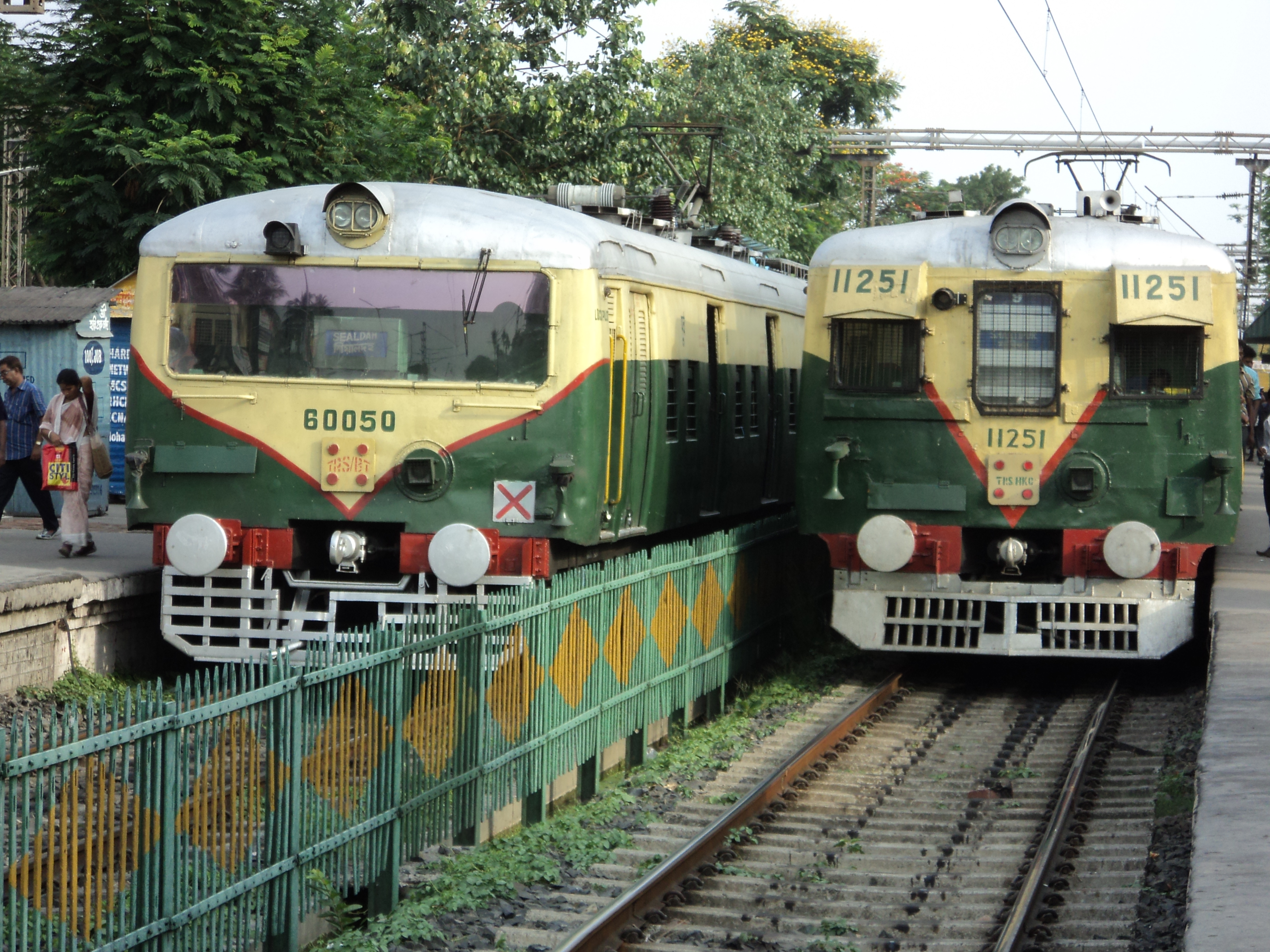
ER Local Trains

Kolkata is well-connected to the rest of India by an extensive railway network of the Indian railways. Two divisions of the Indian railways - the Eastern Railway and the South Eastern Railway - are headquartered in the city. A total of five railway stations serve Kolkata. The two major railway stations of the city are at Howrah and Sealdah. The third station is called Kolkata has recently been constructed. This station is in North Kolkata and can be reached by a road opposite to the Radha Gobinda Kar Medical College & Hospital just beyond Shyambazar. International trains such as Maitree Express and Bandhan Express depart from Kolkata Station. The fourth station is Santragachi Junction which operates weekly and bi-weekly express trains to ease pressure on Howrah junction. The fifth station is named Shalimar Railway Station which used to be a goods yard has been transformed into a station from where mail and express trains operate. Nowadays the Dankuni Station is being given importance and many long route trains stop at this station.

The electrified suburban rail network of the SER and the ER is extensive and stretches far into the neighboring districts of North 24 Parganas, South 24 Parganas, Howrah, Hooghly, Nadia, East Medinipur, West Medinipur and parts of East Barddhaman. The Kolkata Suburban Railway is the largest suburban railway system in India with 1501 km route length.

The Circular Rail encircles the entire city of Kolkata, starting and terminating at Dum Dum Junction. However, the poorly-patronized branch line between Dum Dum Cantonment railway station and Biman Bandar railway station is to be replaced by Yellow Line of Kolkata Metro.

== Rapid transit ==
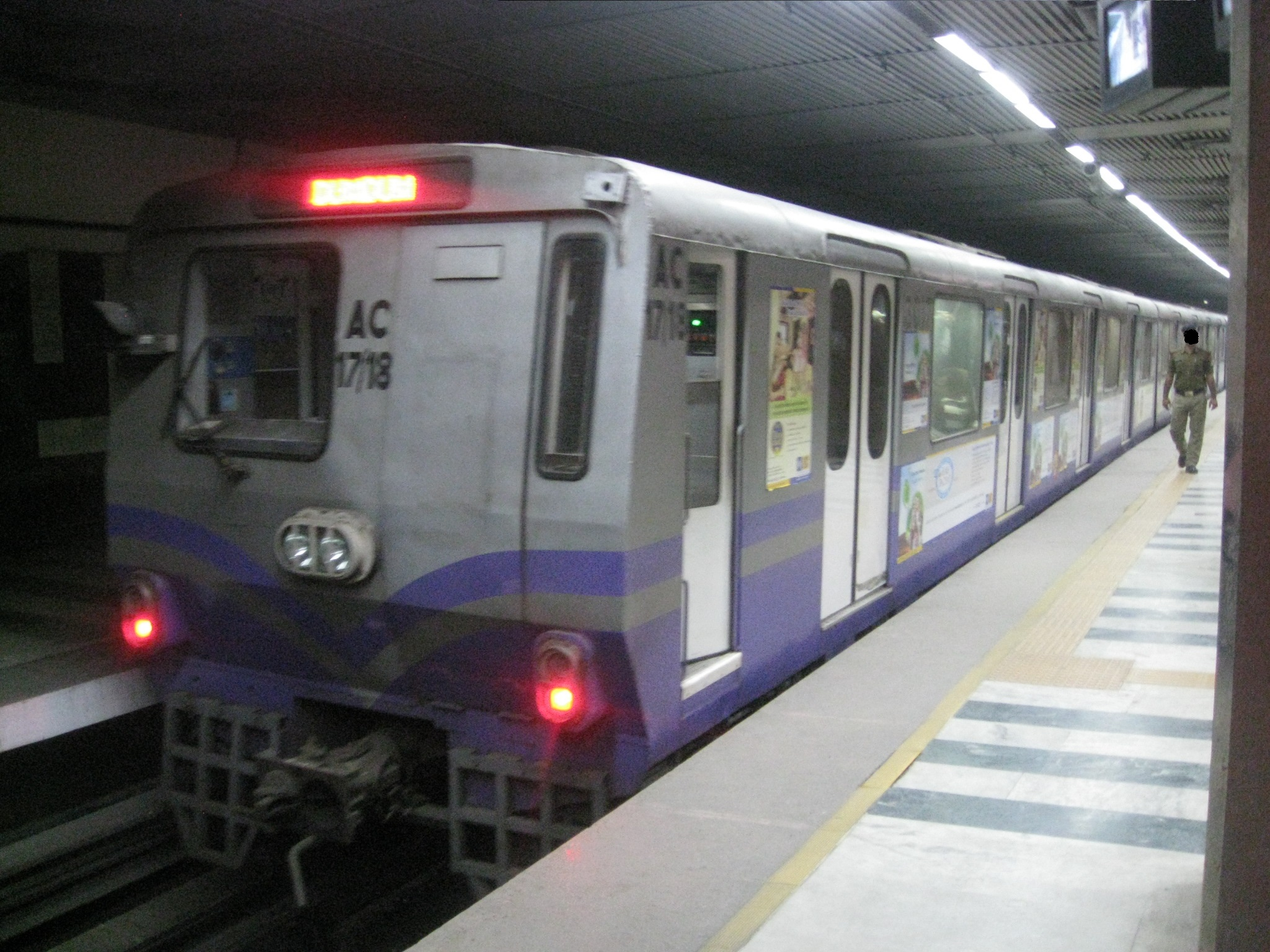
AC Metro Rake of Blue Line

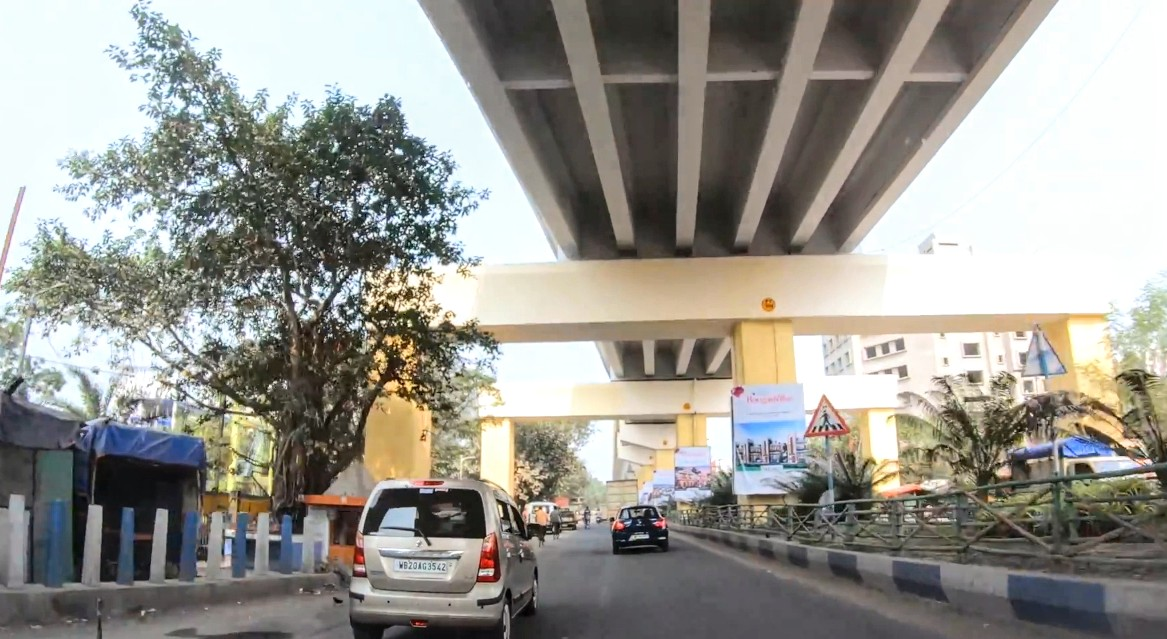
Purple Line viaduct along the Diamond Harbour Road

Kolkata was the first city in South Asia to have an underground railway system that started operating in 1984. Kolkata Metro is the only metro system in India owned by the Indian Railways. It is operated by two subsidiaries of Indian Railways, the Metro Railway, Kolkata and Kolkata Metro Rail Corporation (KMRC). Green Line is operated by the KMRC, while the other lines are operated by Metro Railway, Kolkata. Metro Railway, Kolkata has the status of a Zonal Railway and is directly run by the Indian Railways. The Blue Line is the oldest operating metro system in India which started operation in 1984, and the Green Line is India's first underwater metro system.

Lines which are operational are:

- Blue Line (North–South Metro) begins at Dakshineswar metro station in the north and continues south through Esplanade metro station in the heart of the city until the southern end in Kavi Subhash metro station (New Garia). Blue Line is mostly underground with few elevated portions. It is the oldest metro line in India, inaugurated in 1984.
- Green Line (East–West Metro) is currently operational between Salt Lake Sector-V metro station and Howrah Maidan metro station. Second section of the Green Line cross through the Hooghly River, becoming India's first underwater metro system. The section between Sealdah and Esplanade opened in August 2025. It was inaugurated on 13 February 2020.
- Purple Line is currently operational between Joka and Majerhat. The section from Majerhat to Esplanade is currently under various stages of construction. It was inaugurated on 30 December 2022.
- Orange Line is currently operational between Kavi Subhash metro station (New Garia) and Beleghata metro station. Hemanta Mukhopadhyay–Beleghata metro station section was opened in August 2025. It was inaugurated on 6 March 2024.
- Yellow Line is currently operational between Noapara and Jai Hind via Dum Dum Cantonment.

Currently non-operational lines are:

- Pink Line (Baranagar – Barrackpore) is planned but construction has not yet started.

Some extensions have also been proposed.

Trains run at a frequency of every 5 minutes (Peak Hours) to 15 minutes (Non-Peak Hours) from 6:55 a.m. to 10:30 p.m. from Monday to Saturday and from 09:50 a.m. to 10:00 p.m. on Sunday. Fares range between ₹5 and ₹30. The Kolkata Metro has commendable service, affordable ticket prices, clean stations and safety.

== Buses ==
Kolkata, despite not having any Rapid Bus Transit System, has an extensive network of government run and privately run buses. Private buses in Kolkata and other parts of West Bengal do not have a card system. One has to buy tickets after boarding the bus. However, WBTC run buses do accept 'West Bengal Transport Cards'. The bus tickets are simple paper tickets purchased from the bus conductor. The government buses were previously run by Calcutta State Transport Corporation, Calcutta Tramways Company, West Bengal Surface Transport Corporation, North Bengal State Transport Corporation and South Bengal State Transport Corporation. In the year 2016, the first three government bus companies merged and formed West Bengal Transport Corporation. The government buses are generally painted either blue color with white stripes or white color with blue stripes. This buses are identified by the WBTC symbol on the front windscreen and on their body. Both the name of the destination place as well as the name of the originating place is mentioned on the front of the bus either digitally [LED Board] or written [White Board].The fleet consist of Ashok Leyland JanBus, Tata Motors Marcopolo Bus, and Volvo 8400 buses and Eicher Starline buses. Air-conditioned buses were introduced in the year 2009 under Jawaharlal Nehru National Urban Renewal Mission (JNNURM) and are operated by WBTC.

== Taxis ==
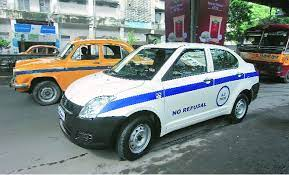
AC White Taxi With Non AC Yellow Taxi

Taxis are a very important aspect of Kolkata. In Kolkata only four people are allowed in a taxi. The non-air conditioned yellow metered Ambassador cabs are slowly being phased out. Many people use them as their main mode of transportation. From December 2013, under Gatidhara Scheme Of Government Of West Bengal, a new fleet of no-refusal taxis had started to ply. In March 2025, a private cab company named Yellow Heritage Cabs started introducing new yellow Wagon-R cabs. These cabs can be booked using the Yatri Sathi app.

== Trams ==
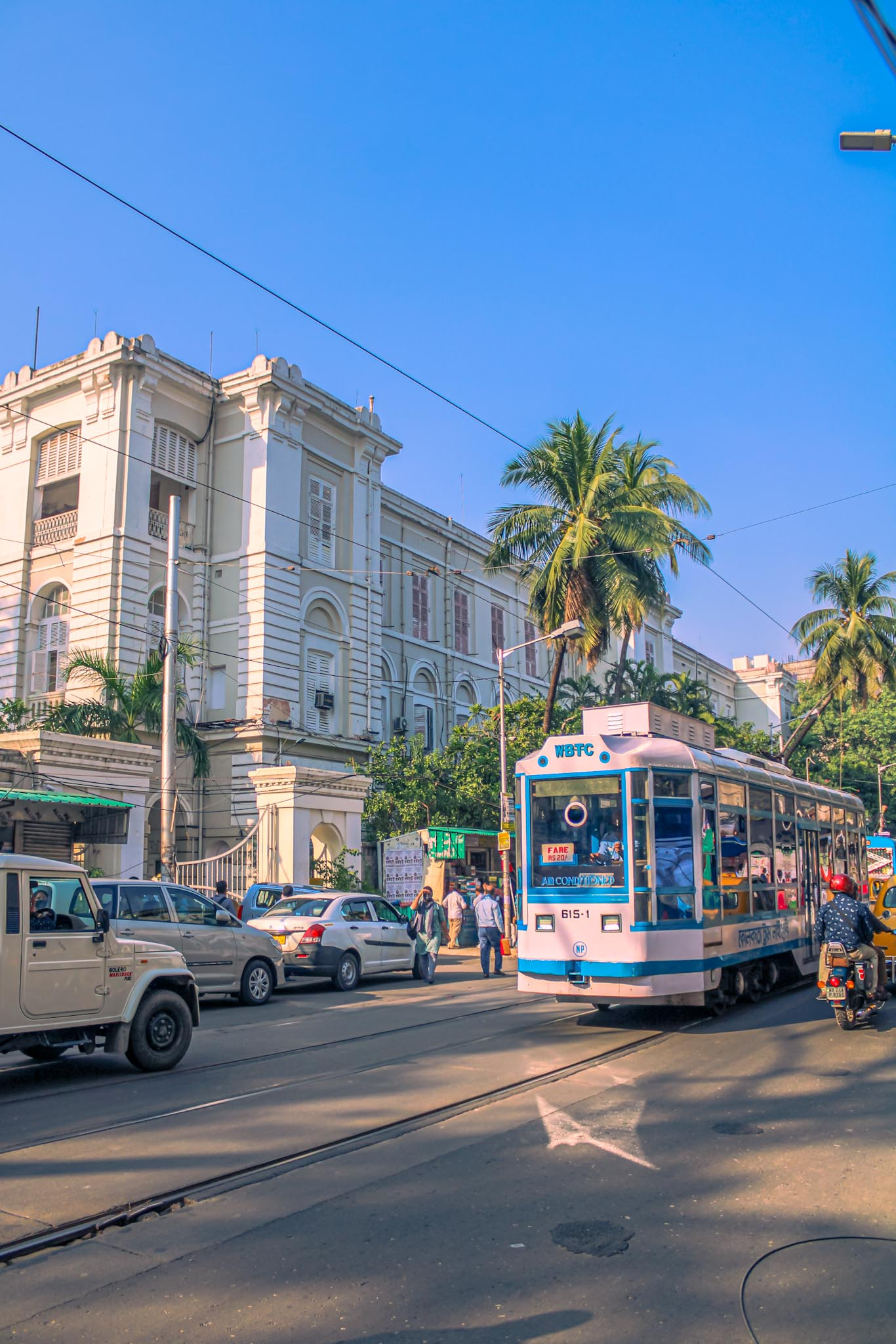
Tram in Kolkata

Kolkata is the only city in India to have a tram network. Trams are under the administration of the Calcutta Tramways Company, a government of West Bengal Undertaking, popularly called CTC (now merged with West Bengal Transport Corporation).

== Small distance vehicles ==
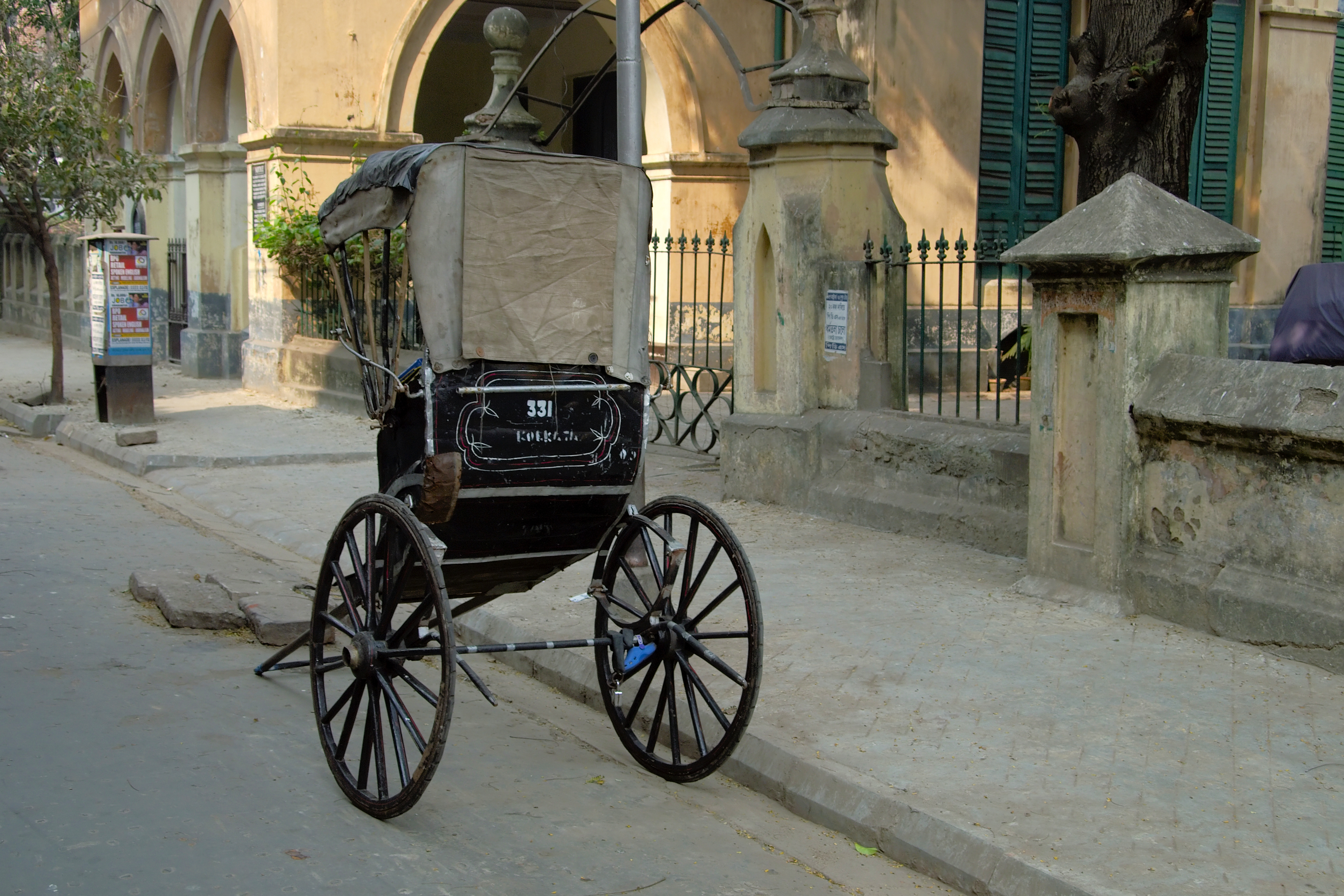
Hand-pulled Rickshaw

Rickshaws pulled by men are common in Kolkata and West Bengal. Many migrants from Bihar and rural West Bengal are involved in rickshaw pulling. Nowadays except for some parts of Kolkata all the hand pulled rickshaws have been replaced by cycle rickshaws. Fares are usually set by the rickshaw unions. These rickshaws usually operate over short distances due to the manual effort involved, and mainly run on narrow lanes where buses and auto-rickshaws don't ply. These rickshaws are not allowed to ply over main roads of Kolkata. Hand pulled rickshaws are mainly found in some old localities of North Kolkata and South Kolkata. Moreover, cycle rickshaws are also now being replaced by E-Rickshaw. They also ply on narrow lanes and not allowed to ply over main roads.

Auto-rickshaws have become a very common mode of transport for short distances. They are usually not metered, and are usually shared. There are several routes, and the auto-rickshaws of a particular route ply between two distinct places of that route only. Colloquially called autos, they usually accommodate three people in the backseat, and one passenger in front beside the driver. The fares are usually quite low compared to other metro cities like Delhi and Mumbai, the minimum fare being Rs10. Unlike other metros, the auto rickshaws do not run on a fare meter. The auto rickshaws are not allowed in major arterial roads and certain part of the city.

Many suburban parts of Kolkata have e-rickshaws running on battery. The minimum fare is Rs.10. Colloquially called "totos", they usually accommodate around 4 people with 2 opposite facing seats. Totos are very popular mode of transport in suburban parts of Kolkata and rural West Bengal. They are considered as a new and cleaner mode of public transport as they run on electricity.

== Airport ==
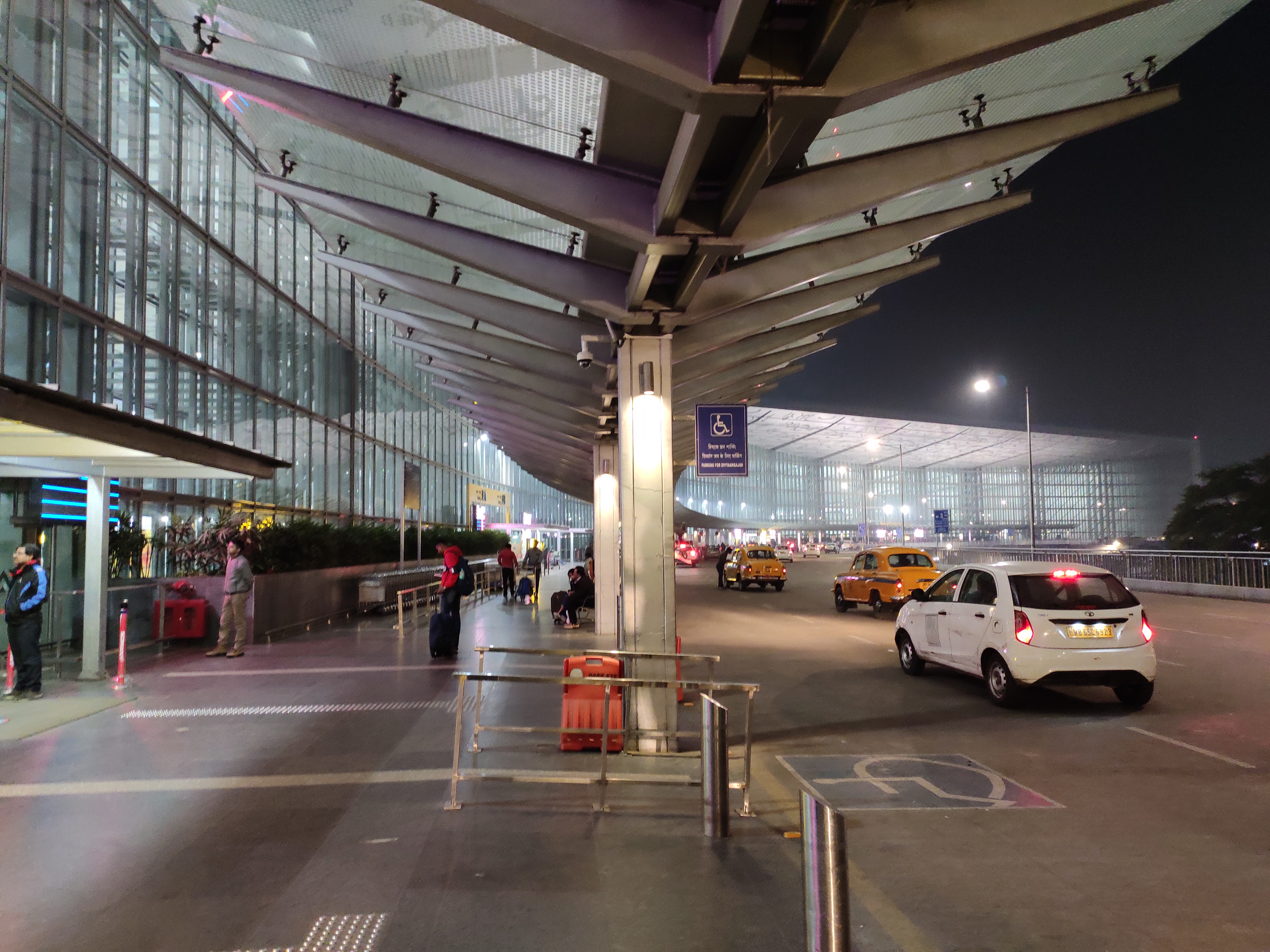
Kolkata Airport Terminal 2

The Netaji Subhash Chandra Bose International Airport (also known as Kolkata Airport/Dum Dum Airport) at Dum Dum is the only airport in Kolkata Metropolitan Area, operating both domestic and international flights. It is an important airport connecting Kolkata to different cities of India and neighboring countries of Nepal, Bhutan and Bangladesh. Kolkata Airport ranks sixth in the list of the busiest airports in India. The number of people using the airport has consistently increased over the last few years. There is a flying club in Behala which has been restored after several years of inactivity. It is the oldest flying institute on the country.

== Water transport ==
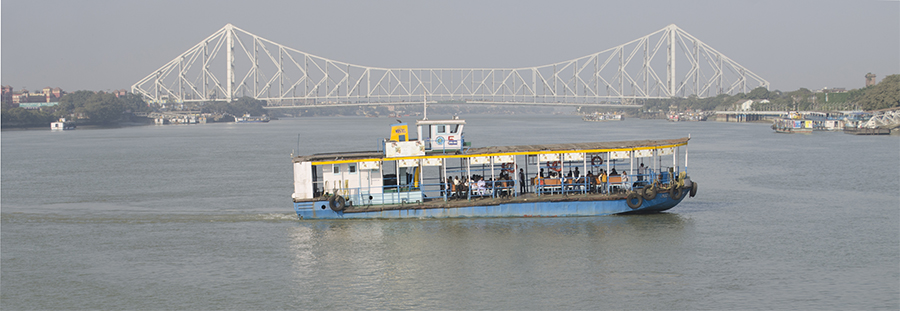
Ferry between Kolkata and Howrah

Kolkata is a major riverine port and together with Haldia deep water port, the Syama Prasad Mookerjee Port Trust (formerly Kolkata Port Trust) has been ranked 6th in India. The port has regular passenger services to Port Blair.Ferry services between Kolkata - Howrah and Kolkata - Sagar Island are available. This ferry services are provided from various ghats like Fairlie Ghat, Howrah Ghat, Shibpur Ghat, Prinsep Ghat, Babughat and Cossipore Ghat.
