= Belgachia =

- Neighbourhood in Kolkata (Calcutta)
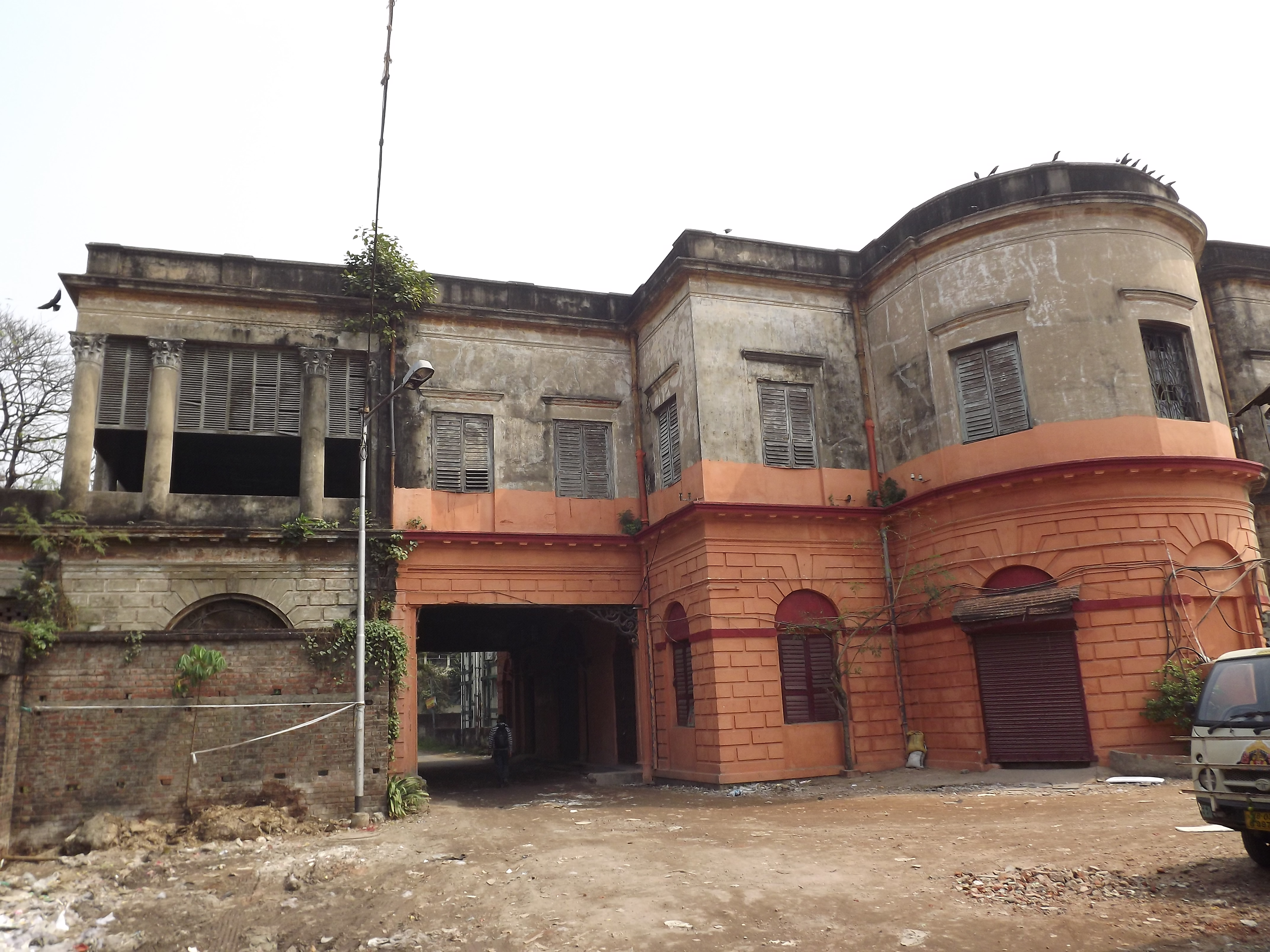
- Belgachia Rajbari

- Location in Kolkata Belgachia (West Bengal)
- Coordinates: 22°36′N 88°23′E
- Country: India
- State: West Bengal
- City: Kolkata
- District: Kolkata
- Metro Station: Belgachia
- Municipal Corporation: Kolkata Municipal Corporation
- KMC wards: 3, 5

Population
  - Total: For population see linked KMC ward pages
- Time zone: UTC+5:30 (IST)
- PIN: 700037
- Area code: +91 33
- Lok Sabha constituency: Kolkata Uttar
- Vidhan Sabha constituency: Kashipur Belgachhia

Belgachia is a neighbourhood of North Kolkata in Kolkata district in the Indian state of West Bengal.

== History ==
The East India Company obtained from the Mughal emperor Farrukhsiyar, in 1717, the right to rent from 38 villages surrounding their settlement. Of these 5 lay across the Hooghly in what is now Howrah district. The remaining 33 villages were on the Calcutta side. After the fall of Siraj-ud-daulah, the last independent Nawab of Bengal, it purchased these villages in 1758 from Mir Jafar and reorganised them. These villages were known en-bloc as Dihi Panchannagram and Belgachia was one of them. It was considered to be a suburb beyond the limits of the Maratha Ditch.

== Transport ==
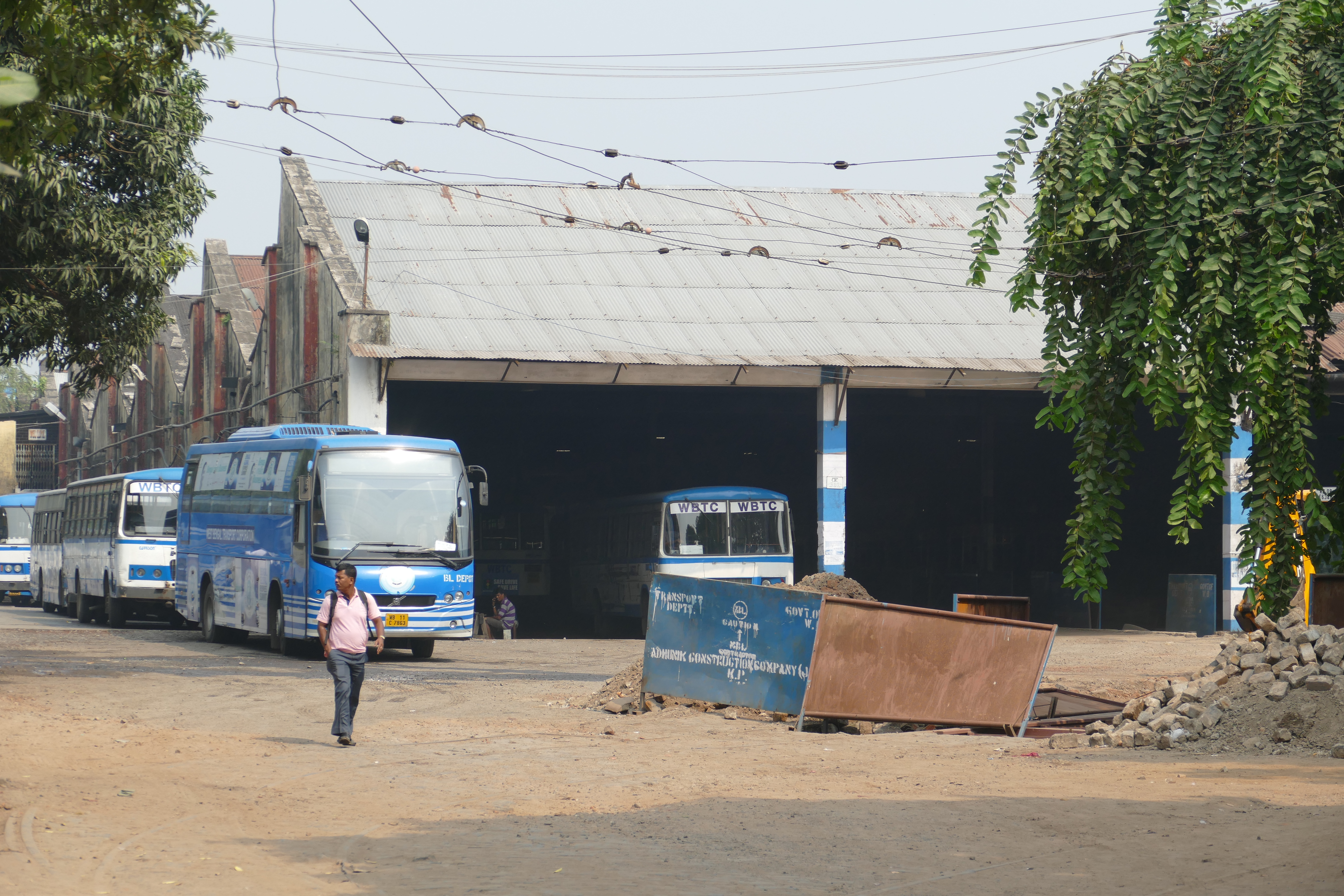
Belgachia CTC (WBTC) Depot

Belgachia Road (part of Jessore Road) passes through Belgachia. It is connected to Tala, Paikpara and Northern Avenue via Manmatha Dutta Road-Tara Shankar Sarani and JK Mitra Road-Raja Manindra Road. Many buses ply along these roads. There is also Belgachia CTC (WBTC) Depot on Belgachia Road.

Important Bus routes of Belgachia are as follows:

- 3B (Milk Colony - New Alipore)
- 3D (Milk Colony - Sakherbazar)
- D-36 (Belgachia - Ecospace)
- ACT-36 (Belgachia - Ecospace)
- D-36A (Belgachia - Ecospace)
- 3C/1 (Nagerbazar - Anandapur)
- 30D (Dum Dum Cant - Babughat)
- 30C (Hatiara - Babughat)
- 47B (Lake Town - Kasba Dhanmath)
- 79B (Barasat - Baghbazar)
- 219 (Nagerbazar - Howrah Stn)
- 211A (Ahiritola - Langolpota)
- 215/1 (Lake Town - Howrah Stn)
- 227 (Bangur Ave - B.N.R)
- KB-16 (Bangur Ave - Shapoorji)
- AC 40 (Airport - Howrah Maidan)
- 93 (Kharibari - Baghbazar)
- 91 (Bhangar - Shyambazar)
- 91A (Harao Banstala - Shyambazar)
- DN-18 (Baduria - Shyambazar)

Belgachia is connected to Shyambazar via Belgachia Rail Overbridge. Earlier there was a tram service up to Belgachia, but now tram tracks are asphalted and tram service is shut down since 2019, due to the excessive pressure on the Belgachia Rail Overbridge.

Kolkata railway station is located here, which is one of the 5 major railway hub stations of Kolkata Metropolitan Area.

Belgachia metro station is the nearest metro station of Kolkata Metro.

== Jain Temple ==
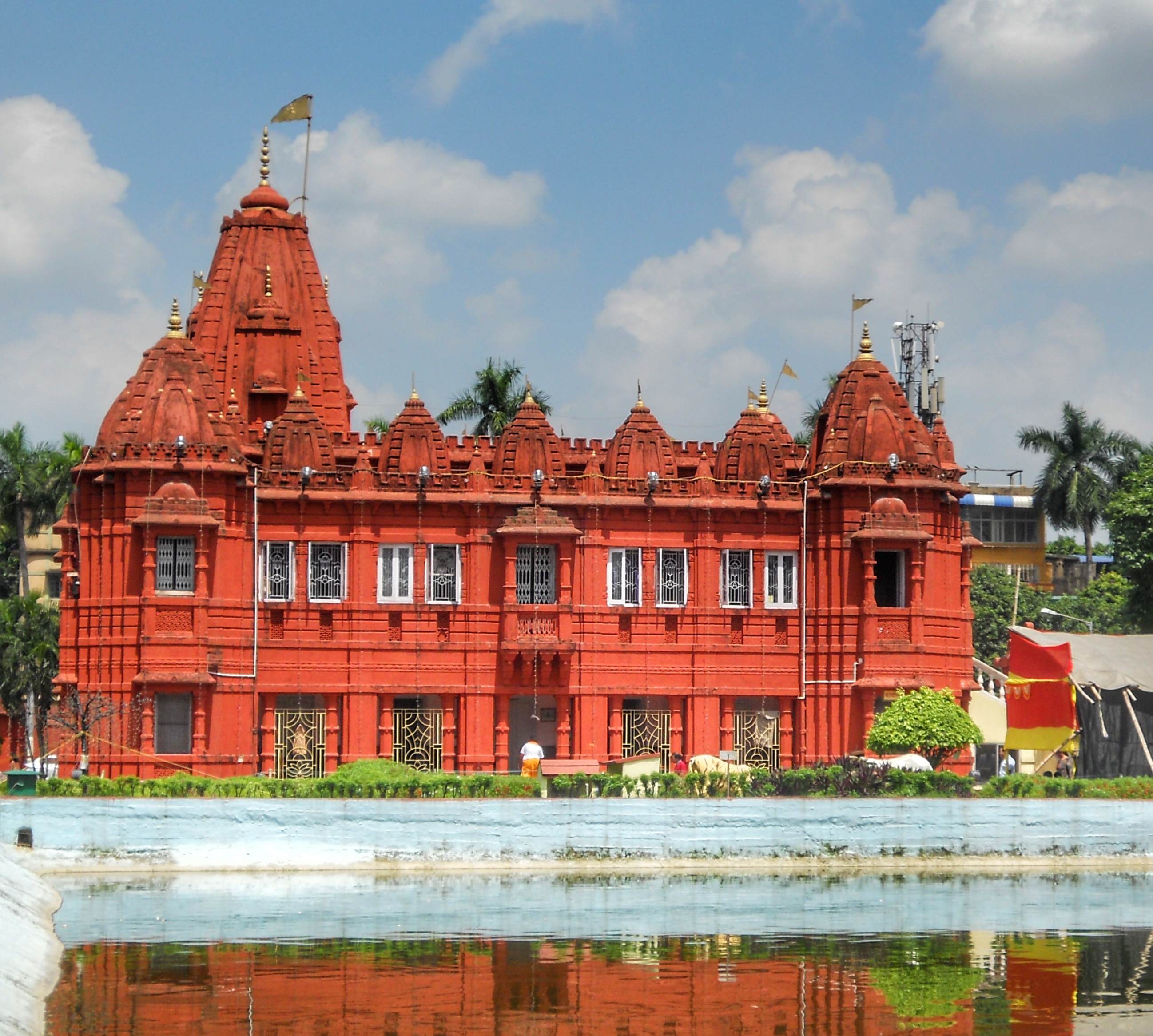
Belgachia Pareshnath Mandir

Shree Digambar Jain Pareswanath Temple is considered one of the most sacred Jain temple of worship in Kolkata. This temple was built in 1914 and belongs to Diagambar sect of Jainism. This Nagar style temple, with ornamental pillars and sculptures copied from the old Jain temples and caves, casts its shadow in the adjoining tank. The temple is surrounded by four gardens. An 81 feet high Manastambha (Pillar of Pride) with white marble is one of the major attraction of this temple. This temple is dedicated to Parshvanatha, the twenty-third tirthakar of Jainism. The temple also has a dharamshala equipped with modern facilities.

== Healthcare ==
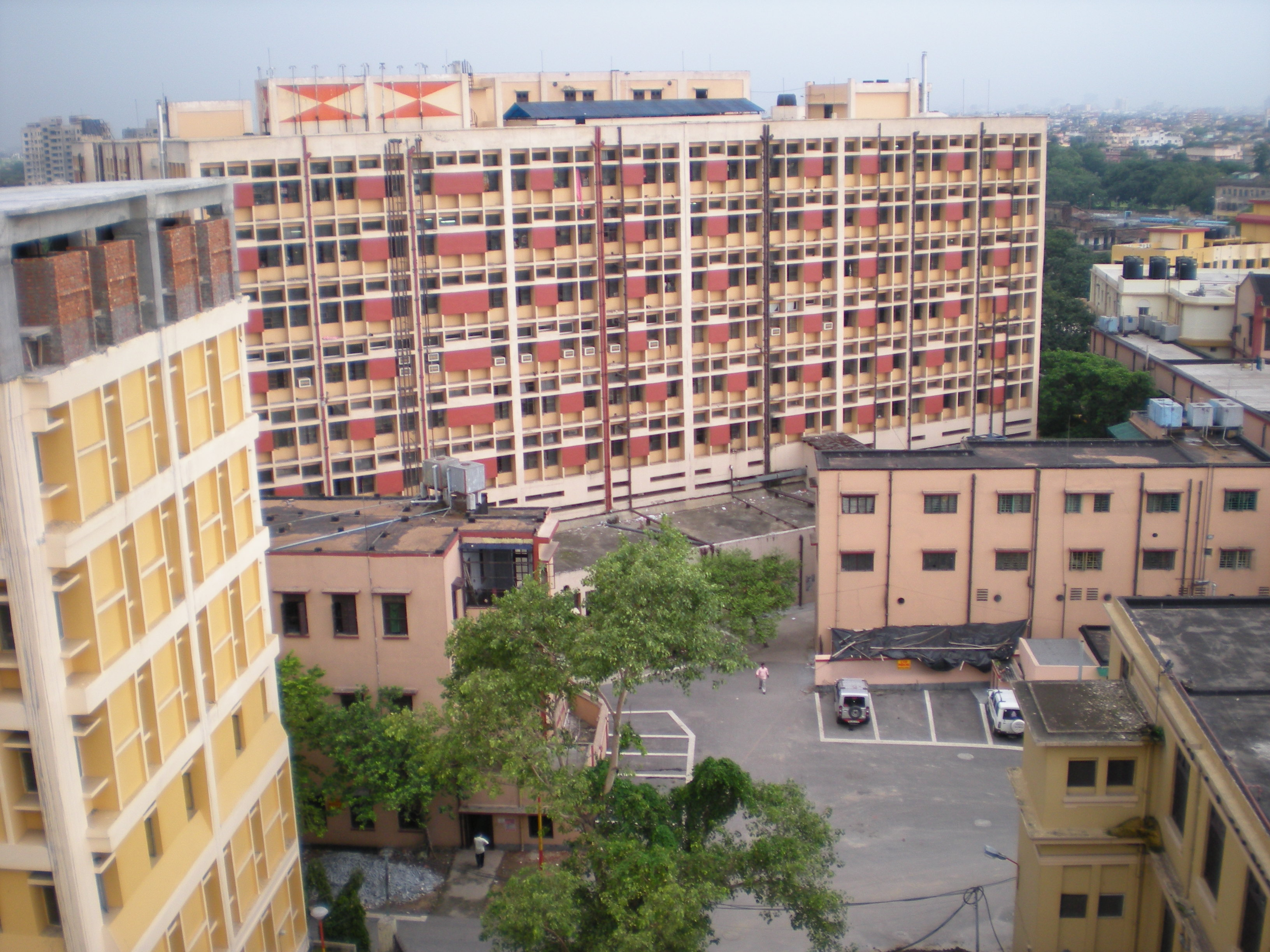
R. G. Kar Medical College and Hospital

R. G. Kar Medical College and Hospital near Belgachia is one of the five government medical colleges and hospitals in Kolkata. The medical college is affiliated with the West Bengal University of Health Sciences and offers undergraduate and post graduate courses. The hospital has 1,200 beds. With the broad vision of taking medical education beyond the limited sphere of the colonial rulers, Dr. Radha Gobinda Kar and other eminent personalities of the period established the Calcutta School of Medicine in 1886. It had its own building in 1902. It was amalgamated, in 1904, with the College of Physicians and Surgeons, which was founded in 1895. Belgachia Medical College, was formally inaugurated in 1916 by Lord Carmichael, the first governor of Bengal, after annulment of the Partition of Bengal (1905). In 1919, the University of Calcutta granted it affiliation for the MB course. As Lord Carmichael played a leading role in the development, the college was named after him. In 1948, the college was renamed after its founder and in 1958, it was taken over by the Government of West Bengal. In 2017, R. G. Kar Medical College was ranked 11th among medical colleges in India by India Today.

== See also ==
- Calcutta Jain Temple
- Jainism in West Bengal
- Kashipur Belgachia (Vidhan Sabha constituency)
- Belgachia East (Vidhan Sabha constituency)
- Belgachia West (Vidhan Sabha constituency)
