= Sanjeev Kanoria =

Surgeon and healthcare chairman

- Born: 18 September 1963 (age 63); Kolkata, West Bengal, India
- Education: La Martiniere Calcutta
- Alma mater: R. G. Kar Medical College and Hospital
- Occupations: Surgeon, scientist, entrepreneur
- Spouse: Sangita Kanoria

Sanjeev Kanoria is a London-based liver transplant surgeon, and healthcare entrepreneur. He is the owner and chairman of Advinia HealthCare as well as the vice-chairman of the supervisory board of Austrian Anadi Bank.

Kanoria is also the principal designer and co-founder of a 350-bed super-specialty hospital in Navi Mumbai. The facility combines science and spirituality, complementing technological advancements with its healing garden and meditation centre, under the auspices of the Yogoda Satsanga Society, a legacy of the renowned master Paramahansa Yogananda.

He is the son of Hari Prasad and Champa Devi Kanoria.

== Medical career ==
Kanoria trained at King's College London and Royal Free Hospital, London. With over 15 years of experience in liver transplant and hepato-pancreato-biliary surgery, he is a Fellow of the Royal College of Surgeons and is listed on the General Medical Council Specialist Register. Kanoria holds a PhD from University College London for his research on reducing liver injury. He is the co-author of the chapter on liver disease in the 26th edition of the esteemed Bailey and Love surgery textbook. After earning an MBA from London Business School and North Western University in 1997, Kanoria worked as a consultant in Healthcare, Strategy & Finance at McKinsey & Co until 1999.

In January 2019, he co-authored a chapter, Dealing with Different Cultures: Overcoming Challenges of Service Design in a Multicultural World: Theory, Concepts, Practice, for the book "Service Design and Service Thinking in Healthcare and Hospital Management".

== Austrian Anadi Bank ==
In 2013, Kanoria acquired the domestic banking unit of Austrian bank Hypo Alpe Adria, founded in 1896. The bank, renamed Austrian Anadi Bank, has corporate, retail and public finance divisions and assets totaling €2.9 billion.

== Advinia Health Care ==
In 1999, having left McKinsey, Kanoria co-founded Advinia Health Care with his wife, Sangita Kanoria, using equity from his London home to fund his PhD in liver transplant. In February 2018, Advinia Health Care acquired 22 care homes and 2,700 beds from Bupa, becoming one of the top ten private care providers in the UK. Today, Advinia operates 38 care homes with 3,250 beds and is valued at over 250 million pounds. In 2017, Advinia Healthcare became the first care provider in the UK to research the use of robots in care homes, participating in the EU-Japan project CARESSES led by University of Genova. The 2 million euros EU-funded project, in partnership with University of Genova, Middlesex University, University of Bedfordshire, Örebro University, SoftBank, Japan Advanced Institute of Science and Technology, Nagoya University and Chubu University, ran from January 2017 to January 2020. The Pepper robot, owned by Softbank, was embedded with an Artificial Intelligence developed in the project, designed to interact with older people in a culturally competent way to address their needs.

Dr. Kanoria received the Healthcare Economist of the Year award in 2014 at the Pharma Leaders Power Brand Awards.

The world transplant society has honoured Dr Sanjeev kanoria by creating a Dr sanjeev kanoria liver transplant award which will be awarded every year in perpetuity for innovation in liver transplant https://tts.org/news/tribune-pulse-weekly-newsletter/1657-tts-tribune-pulse-august-10-volume-ix-issue-31#:~:text=Sanjeev%20%26%20Sangita%20Kanoria%20Foundation%E2%80%94honouring,%2C%20innovation%2C%20and%20patient%20care.
