= Belgachia Villa =

Baro Kuthi Rajbari, also known as Belgachia Villa/Paikpara Rajbari, is a banquet hall in what is now the Milk Colony area of Belgachia in North Kolkata. Prince Dwarkanath Tagore bought it from an Italian around 1823. In 1856, it was bought by the Singhs, zamindars of Kandi, for 54 thousand rupees.

== History ==
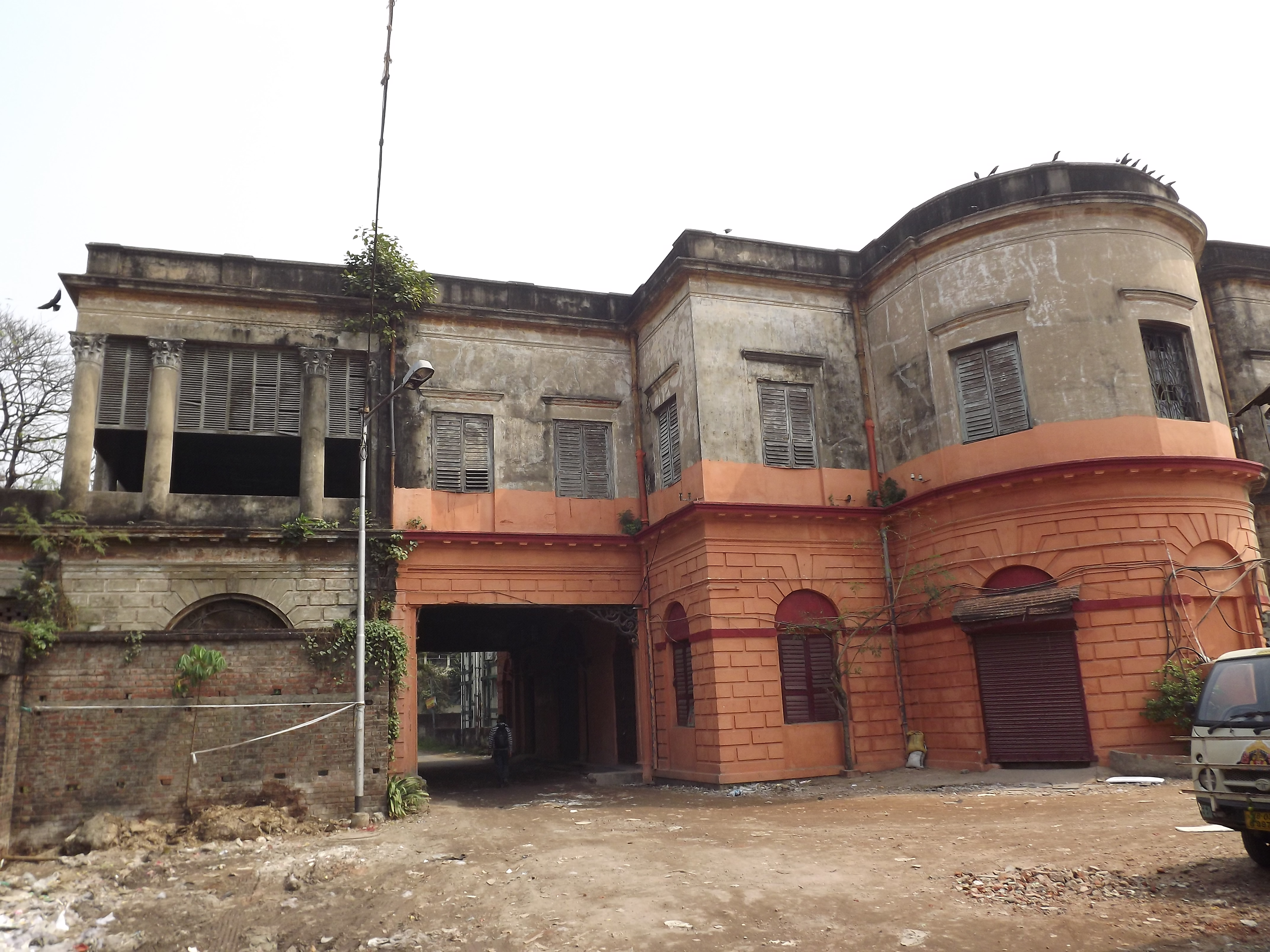
Belgachia Villa

Belgachia Villa initially belonged to Auckland, an Italian. Prince Dwarkanath Tagore bought it from him in 1823. Nearly two hundred thousand rupees were spent to renovate it. In 1835, the second floor was added. All the furniture was imported from England and Italy. Dwarkanath was close to the British and threw large parties here. Rupchand Pokkhi wrote a song in Bengali mocking those events.

In 1846, when he died in England it was discovered that he was heavily in debt due to his extravagant spending. To pay off his debts, his son Debendranath sold Belgachia Villa and other properties. In 1856, the Singhs of Kandi bought the villa in an auction for 54 thousand rupees.
