= Nirmal Kumar Ganguly =

Indian scientist

- Born: 1941 (age 84–85)
- Citizenship: India
- Education: Post Graduate Institute of Medical Education and Research; R. G. Kar Medical College and Hospital
- Awards: Padma Bhushan

Nirmal Kumar Ganguly (born 1941) is an Indian microbiologist specialising in tropical diseases, cardiovascular diseases, and diarrhea.

== Education ==
Ganguly is a graduate of R. G. Kar Medical College, then affiliated with the University of Calcutta. He did his MD in Microbiology from Post Graduate Institute of Medical Education and Research where he also served as Acting Director.

== Career ==
Ganguly has been Emeritus Professor of Post Graduate Institute of Medical Education and Research and was Director General, Indian Council of Medical Research, New Delhi (1998-2007). An elected fellow of the National Academy of Medical Sciences, he is currently President of the Jawaharlal Institute of Postgraduate Medical Education and Research.

== Awards and honours ==
He was awarded the Padma Bhushan in 2009.
