= R. G. Kar Medical College and Hospital =

Public Medical College and tertiary teaching hospital in Kolkata West Bengal, India

- Former names: Calcutta School of Medicine (1886–1916); Belgachia Medical College (1916–1918); Carmichael Medical College (1918–1948)
- Motto: Jivata Jyotirmohi Awadhi
- Recognition: NMC; INC
- Type: Public medical college & hospital
- Established: 1886; 140 years ago
- Founder: Radha Gobinda Kar
- Academic affiliations: West Bengal University of Health Sciences
- Principal: Dr. Manas Kumar Bandyopadhyay
- Undergraduates: 250
- Postgraduates: 175
- Doctoral students: 28
- Location: Belgachia, Kolkata, West Bengal, India; 22°36′15″N 88°22′42″E
- Campus: Urban
- Website: www.rgkarmch.in

R. G. Kar Medical College and Hospital (RGKMCH) is a public medical college and hospital located in Kolkata, West Bengal, India. Established in 1886, it was the first private medical college in Asia. It was established to ensure self-sufficiency in medical education and services in the colonial era. On 12 May 1958, the West Bengal Government assumed management of the establishment. It was affiliated to the University of Calcutta from 1916 to 2003 and to the West Bengal University of Health Sciences since 2003. It is a co-educational institution recognized by the National Medical Commission.

== History ==
Established in 1886 as the Calcutta School of Medicine, it had no affiliated hospital and practiced out of the Mayo Hospital. In 1902, it moved to its own complex including a school building and hospital. In 1904, it merged with the National College of Physicians and Surgeons of Bengal and, after a period of further growth, was renamed as the Belgachia Medical College in 1916. From 1918 to 1948, the college was known as Carmichael Medical College in honor of Thomas Gibson-Carmichael, the Governor of Bengal at the college's inauguration in 1916. The institution was given its current name on 12 May 1948 to honour Dr. Radha Gobinda Kar who first conceived of it. Dr. Suresh Prasad Sarbadhikari was the first President of the institution, and Kar was its first Secretary. On 12 May 1958, control of the college was passed to the state of West Bengal.

== Academics ==
The college offers MBBS, post-graduate diploma (DNB), post degree medical courses (MS, MD) and super specialty courses (DM, and MCh).It has a capacity of 250 MBBS, 175 MD, MS, DNB Seats. And 28 DM, MCH Seats. Recently MCh in Neurosurgery opened in this college.

== 2024 sexual assault and murder case ==
On 9 August 2024, a 31 year old second-year female postgraduate physician training in chest medicine at the college was found dead in the seminar hall on the college campus. An autopsy report later confirmed that she had been raped and murdered. The incident triggered outrage and protests throughout the country, demanding a thorough investigation while also questioning the safety of female physicians and the government's suppression of the investigative details.

== Notable alumni ==
- Sushovan Banerjee, Indian physician and politician, Padma Shri awardee
- Sanjeev Kanoria, liver transplant surgeon, owner of Advinia HealthCare
- Nirmal Kumar Ganguly, microbiologist, Padma Bhushan awardee
- Santanu Sen, former Member of Parliament in Rajya Sabha from West Bengal
- Shashi Panja, former cabinet minister of Government of West Bengal
- Samar Banerjee, player of India national football team
- Nachiketa Ghosh, Bengali music director
- Ragini Sonkar, Member of Uttar Pradesh Legislative Assembly
- Kakoli Ghosh Dastidar, Member of Parliament in Lok Sabha
- Nihar Ranjan Gupta, Bengali novelist
- Ratna De, former Member of West Bengal Legislative Assembly
- Sandip Ghosh, orthopedic surgeon and former principal of R.G. Kar Medical College and Hospital.
- Talimeran Ao, Indian Footballer, Former Director of Health Services of Nagaland.

== See also ==
- Calcutta Homoeopathic Medical College & Hospital
- Calcutta Unani Medical College and Hospital
