= Sushovan Banerjee =

Indian doctor and politician (died 2022)

- Born: 30 September 1938; Bolpur, West Bengal, British Raj
- Died: 26 July 2022 (aged 83); Ultadanga, Kolkata, West Bengal, India
- Other name: One Rupee Doctor
- Education: R. G. Kar Medical College and Hospital; Calcutta University
- Known for: Politician, social worker, physician
- Awards: Padma Shri (2020)

Sushovan Banerjee (c. 1938 – 26 July 2022), also known as One Rupee Doctor, was an Indian physician and politician. He was known for treating needy people for one rupee. In 1984, he was the MLA of Bolpur. In 2020, he was awarded the fourth highest civilian honour of India Padma Shri by the Indian Government for his contribution in the field of medicine.

== Early life ==
Banerjee was from Bolpur, West Bengal. He did his graduation from R. G. Kar Medical College and Hospital and did his PG degree in Pathology from Calcutta University. Then he moved to London for a diploma in Haematology.

== Career ==
Banerjee had contested on an Indian National Congress ticket in 1984 and was elected as the member of the West Bengal Legislative Assembly from Bolpur. Since 1963 he was treating poor patients for just one rupee. Only during the COVID-19 pandemic he had to shut down his medical clinic for sometime, otherwise his clinic was always open.

In 2020 he held his name in the Guinness World Records for treating the maximum number of patients in a lifetime. In the same year, he was awarded the Padma Shri by the Indian Government for his contribution on the field of medicine. He has also got a gold medal from R. G. Kar Medical College and Hospital.

== Personal life ==
Banerjee died on 26 July 2022, at the age of 84.

== Awards ==
- Gold Medal
- Padma Shri in 2020
