= Radha Gobinda Kar =

Indian physician and philanthropist (1852–1918)

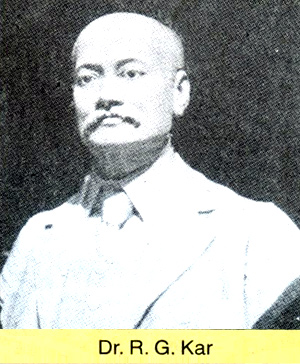
- Born: Radha Gobinda Kar; 23 August 1852; Santragachi, Howrah District, Bengal Presidency, British India
- Died: 19 December 1918 (aged 68); Calcutta, Bengal Presidency, British India
- Education: Medical College and Hospital, Kolkata; University of Edinburgh
- Occupation: Physician

Radha Gobinda Kar (Bengali: রাধাগোবিন্দ কর; 23 August 1852 – 19 December 1918) was an Indian physician and philanthropist. R. G. Kar Medical College and Hospital in Kolkata, West Bengal is named after him.

== Family ==
Radha Gobinda was born on 23 August 1852 at Santragachhi, West Bengal. His father, Durgadas Kar, was a physician.

== Education ==
After passing the entrance examination from Hindu School, Radha Gobinda enrolled in Calcutta Medical College to study medicine for the next 5 years within which he took a year-long sabbatical in 1879. He received his medical degree from the University of Edinburgh in 1883.

== Early Practice ==
After finishing his studies, he returned to Calcutta to start his practice. Initially, he would see poor patients for free. His practice became established and people started coming from villages and far-flung areas to get treated by him.

Kar observed his classmates faltering due to a language problem and this inspired him to translate and write medical books in the Bengali language. His first book was 'Bhishabandhu'. Published in 1871. He wrote several books and notable among them are 'Concise Physiology', 'Rogi Paricharchyya', 'Vishaka Suhrid', 'Plague', 'Illustration and Brief Theory of Gynecology', 'Brief Infant and Child Medicine', 'Brief Physiology', and 'Kaviraj Doctor News'.

His friends, patients and fraternity requested him to start a college where he could share his knowledge and treat patients. Moreover, the fight for freedom was intensifying: it added to the reasons to start a medical school in Calcutta, with Bengal clearly distancing itself from the Central British Raj and looking to set its own independent identity, it gave him the conviction to build a school with a modern outlook.

== Calcutta Medical School ==
The vision to build a medical school with modern scientific knowledge was compelling and became his life goal. But, there came the problem. He was a man of limited means. No family wealth could support an audacious goal like this. He needed to buy a piece of land, construct and start a hospital. He requested his friends to loan him money. That was not proving to be enough.

He would stand outside the weddings taking place in Calcutta, where he could meet a number of well-to-do people. He would pitch his vision to the guests and request them to invest/give him some money. This is how he collected some seed funding. Seeing his determination, some of his doctor friends joined him in the mission.

In order to provide a facility not associated with the British Raj, Kar, Dr. Mahendranath Banerjee, Dr. Akshoy Kumar Dutta, Dr Bipin Behari Moitra, Dr. M.L. De, Dr. B. G. Banerjee, Dr. Kunda Bhattacharya and numerous other doctors founded the Calcutta School of Medicine on 18 October 1886. It was the first private medical college in Asia, established to ensure self-sufficiency in medical education and services. The school changed its name to the Calcutta Medical School in August 1887, and it became The Calcutta Medical School and College of Physicians and Surgeons of Bengal after amalgamating with the College of Physicians and Surgeons of Bengal in 1904. Dr. Bidhan Chandra Roy, who later became the Chief Minister of West Bengal, was a Professor there.

In 1916, it was renamed Belgachhia Medical College,.

In 1918, a society named as "Medical Education Society of Bengal" was formed for the better management of the Institution. Suresh Prasad Sarbadhikari was the first President of the institution, and Kar was its first Secretary. On 12 May 1918, after the demise of Shri Radha Gobinda Kar, the college was renamed as R. G. Kar Medical College and Hospital.
