= Pepper (robot) =

Model of humanoid robot

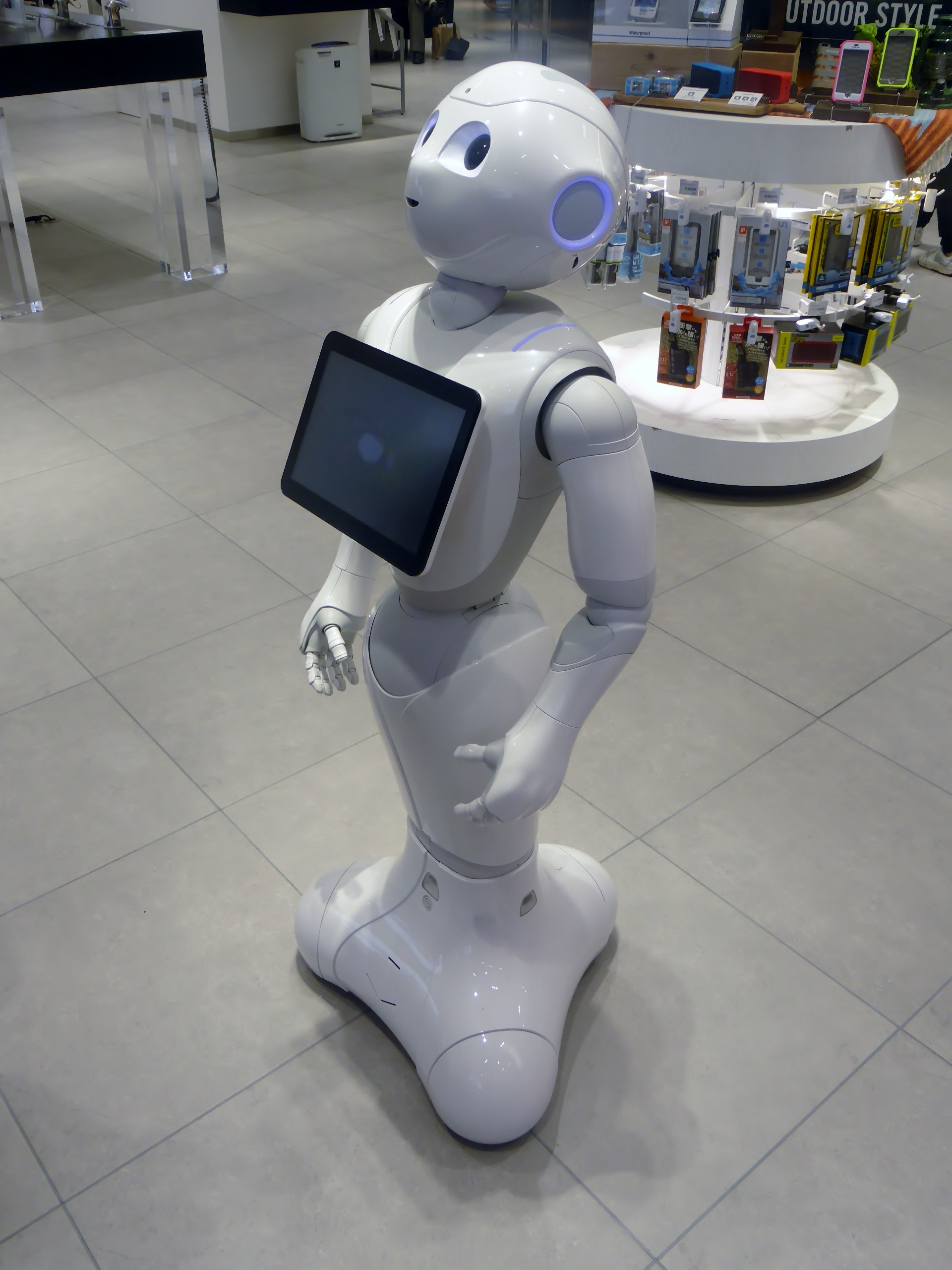
- Pepper
- Manufacturer: Aldebaran Robotics (formerly SoftBank Robotics, now part of United Robotics); Foxconn
- Country: France; Japan
- Year of creation: first prototype 2012, official launch June 2014
- Type: Humanoid
- Purpose: Technology demonstrator
- Website: aldebaran.com

Pepper is a semi-humanoid robot manufactured by Aldebaran Robotics (formerly Softbank Robotics Europe), designed with the ability to read emotions. It was introduced in Japan in June 2014 and manufactured until 2020.

== History ==
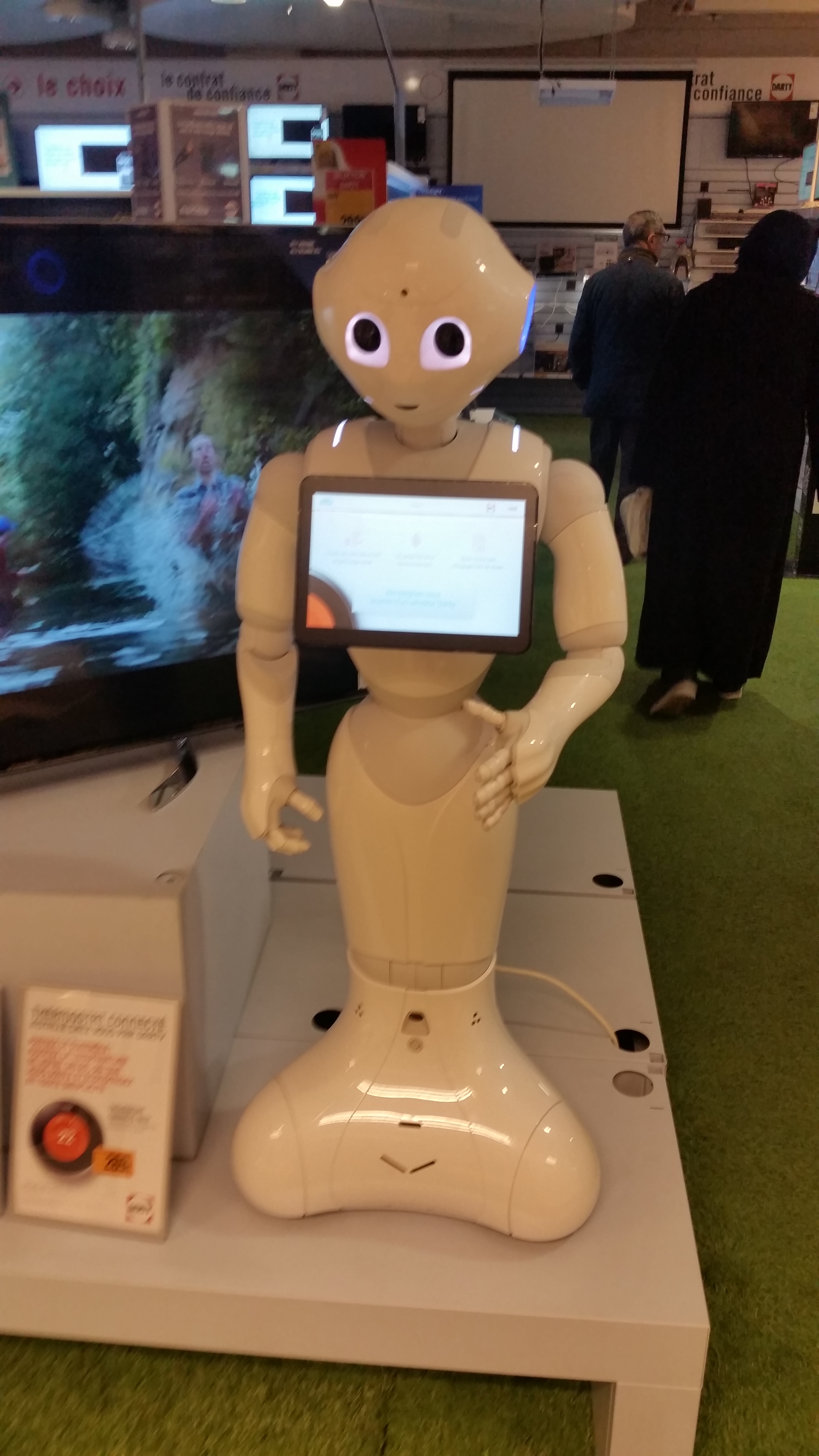
Pepper in a Darty shop in La Défense, Paris, 2016

Pepper was introduced in Tokyo on 5 June 2014 by Masayoshi Son, founder of SoftBank. and was showcased in SoftBank Mobile phone stores in Japan beginning the next day. Pepper's ability to recognize emotion is based on detection and analysis of facial expressions and voice tones. Production of Pepper was paused in June 2021, due to weak demand.

Pepper was scheduled to be available in December 2015 at SoftBank Mobile stores. Pepper went on sale in June 2015 with the first batch of 1,000 units selling out in just 60 seconds.

Pepper was launched in the UK in 2016.

By May 2018, 12,000 Pepper robots had been sold in Europe.

In June 2021, it was reported SoftBank would pause production of Pepper, citing weak demand. At the time, an estimated 27,000 units had been manufactured.

On 11 January 2024, a voice library based on Pepper's voice was released to the public by VoiSona (vocal synthesizer by the same creators as CeVIO).

In 2025 its manufacturer Aldebaran Robotics went into receivership almost certainly ensuring no future for the robot

== Use ==
=== Commercial ===
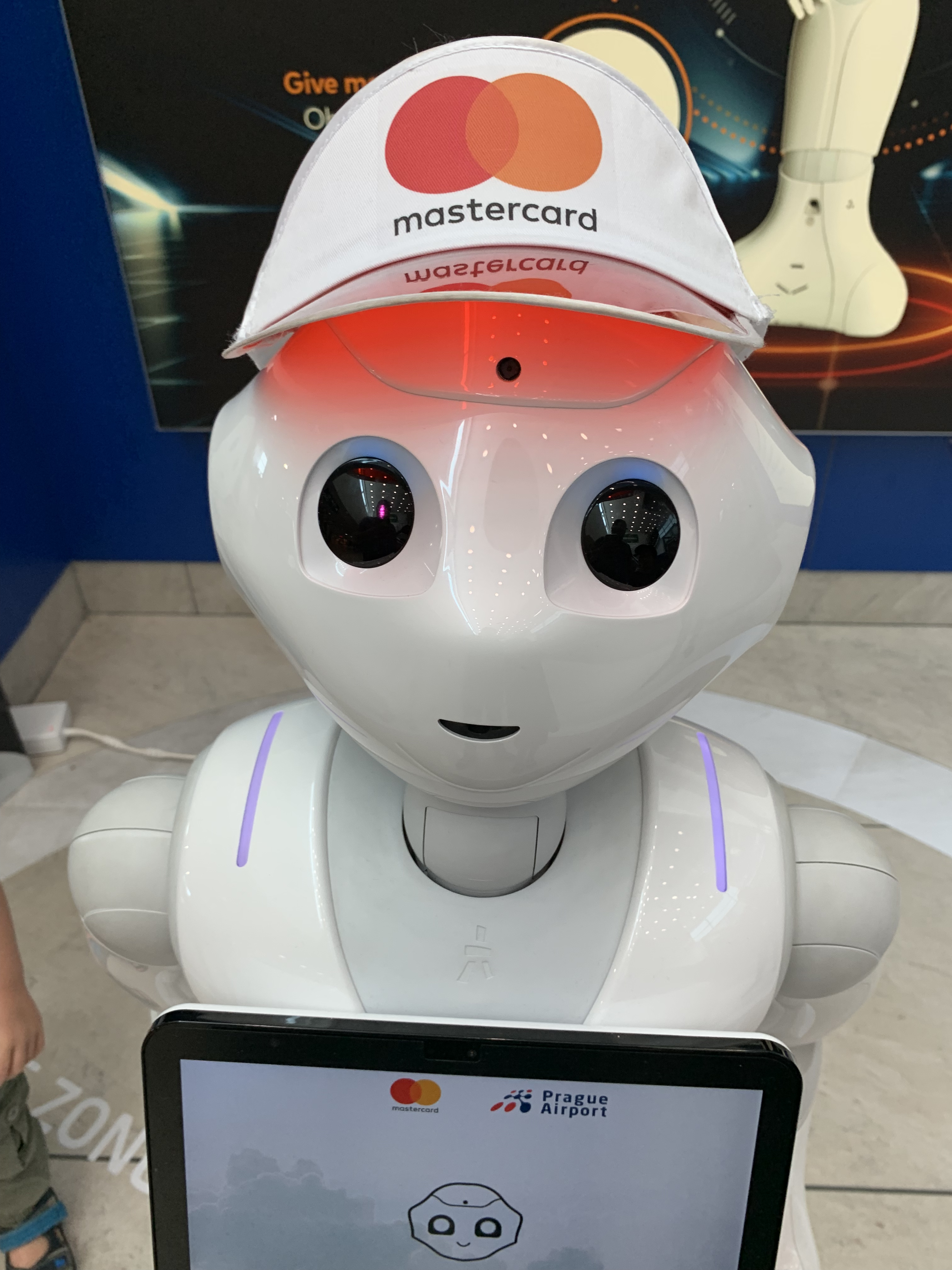
Pepper in Prague airport, 2019

Pepper has been used as a receptionist at several offices in the UK and can identify visitors with facial recognition, send alerts for meeting organisers and arrange for drinks to be made. Pepper can chat autonomously to prospective clients. The first functioning Pepper receptionist in the UK was supplied by a SoftBank distributor and was installed in London at Brainlabs.

The robot has also been used at banks and medical facilities in Japan, using applications created by Seikatsu Kakumei. and it is also used in all branches of Hamazushi restaurants in Japan.

Pepper is used in North American airports such as Montréal–Trudeau International Airport, Canada. The robot is used to greet travelers, offer menus and recommendations.

In 2018, Pepper robot was introduced in the United Arab Emirates.

In December 2019, a dozen Pepper robots were installed at the "Pepper PARLOR cafe in Tokyo, Japan.

=== Sports ===
On 9 July 2020, a team of Pepper robots performed as cheerleaders at a baseball game between the Fukuoka SoftBank Hawks and the Rakuten Eagles, supported by a team of Boston Dynamics Spot quadrupedal robots.

=== Consumer ===
In 2017, Pepper was reported to have been used in thousands of homes in Japan.

=== Academic ===
Pepper is available as a research and educational robot for schools, colleges and universities to teach programming and conduct research into human-robot interactions.

In 2017, an international team began research into using Pepper as versatile robot to help look after older people in care homes or sheltered accommodation. The project CARESSES aimed at developing the world's first culturally-competent robot, received funding worth more than two million Euros, with donors including the European Union and the Japanese government. The project was expected to run for three years. Institutions involved in the research include University of Genoa (Project Coordinator), Örebro University, Middlesex University, the University of Bedfordshire, SoftBank Robotics, Advinia HealthCare, Japan Advanced Institute of Science and Technology (Japanese coordinator), Nagoya University, Chubu University. On Tuesday 16 October 2018, a Pepper robot mentioned the CARESSES project while giving evidence to the Education Committee of the House of Commons of the United Kingdom Parliament.

Long-term research with Pepper could show that residents of care home are willing to interact with humanoid robots and benefit from cognitive and physical activation that is led by the robot Pepper. Another long-term study in a care home could show that people working in the care sector are willing to use robots in their daily work with the residents. It also revealed that even though the robots are ready to be used, require human assistance. They cannot replace workers, only assist them.

== Design ==
=== Purpose ===
Pepper is not a functional robot for domestic use. Instead, Pepper is intended "to make people enjoy life", enhance people's lives, facilitate relationships, have fun with people and connect people with the outside world. Pepper's creators hope that independent developers will create new content and uses for Pepper.

=== Specifications ===
The robot's head has four microphones, two HD cameras (in the mouth and forehead), and a 3-D depth sensor (behind the eyes). There is a gyroscope in the torso and touch sensors in the head and hands. The mobile base has two sonars, six lasers, three bumper sensors, and a gyroscope.

It can run the existing content in the app store designed for SoftBank's Nao robot.

Pepper
Dimensions	Height: 1.20 metres (4 ft); Depth: 425 millimetres (17 in); Width: 485 millimetres (19 in)
Weight	28 kilograms (62 lb)
Battery	Lithium-ion battery Capacity: 30.0Ah/795Wh; Operation time: approx. 12hrs (when used at shop)
Display	10.1-inch touch display
Head	Mic × 4, RGB camera × 2, 3D sensor × 1, Touch sensor × 3
Chest	Gyro sensor × 1
Hands	Touch sensor × 2
Legs	Sonar sensor × 2, Laser sensor × 6, Bumper sensor × 3, Gyro sensor × 1
Moving parts	Degrees of motion Head (2°), Shoulder (2° L&R), Elbow (2 rotations L&R), Wrist (1° L&R), Hand with 5 fingers (1° L&R), Hip (2°), Knee (1°), Base (3°); 20 Motors
Platform	NAOqi OS
Networking	Wi-Fi: IEEE 802.11 a/b/g/n (2.4 GHz/5 GHz） Ethernet x1 (10/100/1000 base T)
Motion speed	Up to 3 kilometres per hour (2 mph)
Climbing	Up to 1.5 centimetres (0.6 in)

== Incidents ==
In September 2015, a visitor frustrated with his customer experience in Tokyo lashed out against Pepper, damaging the unit.

In 2018, a supermarket in Edinburgh, Scotland removed the service robot within a week as it was unpopular with customers. This was said to be due to high levels of background noise making the robot unable to hear questions properly, and customers being unwilling to interact with a robot when human help was available.

== See also ==
- Musio
- Nao
