= Roopchand Pakshi =

Bengali poet, singer and composer (1815–c.1890)

- Roopchand Das Mahapatra
- Born: c. 1815; Odisha, India
- Died: c. 1890 (aged 74–75); Calcutta, India
- Education: Hare School, Kolkata
- Occupations: Poet, singer, composer, satirist
- Notable work: Sangeet Rasakallol

Roopchand Pakshi (Bengali: রূপচাঁদ পক্ষী; c. 1815 – c. 1890) was a Bengali poet, singer, composer, satirist, and performer of panchali, tappā, and dhap songs.

== Early life ==
Roopchand Pakshi was born Roopchand Das Mahapatra (Odia: ରୂପଚାନ୍ଦ ଦାସ ମହାପାତ୍ର) in 1815 to Gourhori Das Mahapatra. His ancestral home was situated near Chilika Lake in what is now Odisha. The family migrated from Odisha to Calcutta (now Kolkata) during Pakshi's early years; he grew up and spent the rest of his life in the city. He studied at the Hare School at College Street. He trained under local music teachers, such as Golam Abbas Tabalchi, Chhotey Miah, and Ramchandra Banerjee.

== Musical and literary contributions ==
Pakshi's musical and literary output frequently included satirical narratives and social commentary. He composed songs on a wide array of subjects. He routinely sang about contemporary topics, including the introduction of the railways, widow marriage, kanyādāna, and other things. Outside of his panchali, tappā, dhap, and baul compositions, Pakshi also performed devotional music. He called himself pakshi, literally meaning 'bird' in Bengali. He formed a troupe of performers called Pakshir Dal (lit. 'association of birds'), and was colloquially known as the "bird king." Pakshi and his group were ganjika drinkers; cannabis was central to their craft and identity.

Pakshi was also noted for often combining Bengali and English in some of his compositions. An oft-cited lyric from a song of his in praise of Lord Krishna goes:

Let me go, o he dvārī
I visit to vaṃśīdhārī

(all English)
[Let me go, O gatekeeper
I'm going to visit the flute-bearer (Krishna)]

Pakshi died in around 1890.

== Notable works ==
- Sangeet Rasakallol (A Wave of Musical Delight)
- Kalikātā Barnan (A Description of Calcutta)
- Helay Hāy Jāy (The Day Slips by Casually)
- Kāṭāli Kāl Hoyē Nākāl (Broken and Ruined by Time)
