= Yatri Sathi =

Ride-hailing application in West Bengal, India

- Native name: যাত্রী সাথী
- Company type: Ridesharing application
- Founded: October 16, 2023; 2 years ago in Kolkata, India
- Headquarters: Kolkata, India
- Area served: Kolkata metropolitan area Siliguri
- Parent: Department of Information Technology & Electronics, Government of West Bengal

Yatri Sathi is a ride hailing application overseen by the Government of West Bengal. It was created to put the yellow taxis in Kolkata under one payment system to allow passengers to pay no surge charge or commission and prevent middlemen from being involved. It was designed by the Open Network for Digital Commerce (ONDC). The government of West Bengal provided drivers with Yatri Sathi decals for their cabs. The Netaji Subhas Chandra Bose International Airport gives drivers free parking.

By October 2023, more than 60% of the yellow and blue and white taxis of the city had switched to the platform.

In June 2024, it was announced that the app would be available in Siliguri in July 2024. Also that month it was announced that ambulance services would be soon available. It was made available at Bagdogra Airport in July 2024.

In May 2025, "Where Is My Bus," a real-time feature which provides service information about public buses, was added to the app.

Yatri Sathi also offers users the ability to book bike taxis, bus tickets, and ambulances. It also offers parcel delivery services and the ability to book tickets for popular Kolkata tourist attractions.

The app offers SOS buttons for passengers and drivers in case of emergency. Pressing on the red button alerts the passenger's primary contacts and the police. Pressing the blue SOS button will, on the count of five seconds, emit a siren and informs primary contacts, the police, and the app's security team.
