= Advinia HealthCare =

British health care provider

Advinia Healthcare
- Industry: Healthcare management
- Founded: 1999
- Founder: Dr Sanjeev Kanoria and Sangita Kanoria
- Headquarters: Finchley Central, London, United Kingdom
- Website: https://advinia.co.uk

Advinia Healthcare Ltd is one of the largest private care providers in the United Kingdom. Advinia operates 38 care homes and 3,250 beds across England and Scotland.

== History ==
Advinia Health Care was founded in 1999 by Dr Sanjeev Kanoria. He is also the owner and deputy chairman of Austrian Anadi Bank.

In 2011, the company acquired a number of under-performing care homes.

In 2012, Advinia opened the first specialist unit for residents suffering from memory loss caused by alcohol abuse in the North East of England. They have similar units in London and Scotland.

In February 2018, the company acquired a further 22 care homes, including 11 in Scotland, with 2,700 beds, from BUPA for an undisclosed amount. Advinia took over the employment of the 3,700 staff at the Bupa homes.

As reported in 2019, the firm was under investigation by regulators, the latter stating Advenia Group was "failing to co-operate with a regulatory inquiry into its finances." The Guardian wrote that the Care Quality Commission (CQC) "has become seriously concerned in recent months about the group’s cash flow and financial management, as well as its refusal to submit" to an independent audit of its finances. "Advinia’s submissions to the CQC...showed the company was not generating enough cash to meet capital and interest repayments in the next few months". Failure to comply may result in the revocation of its license.

In April 2020 one Scottish-based care home run by Advinia Health Care was featured in articles recording the highest reports of death due to Covid-19 within care home up to that date.

== Technology ==
From November 2018 to October 2019, Advinia Health Care conducted a trial of using humanoid Pepper robots at its care homes to assist in mental health care and alleviate staff shortages. The €2 million project was funded by the European Union and the Government of Japan, and conducted in partnership with Middlesex University and the University of Bedfordshire.

== See also ==
- Private healthcare in the United Kingdom
