= Calcutta State Transport Corporation =

Public transport operator in Kolkata, India

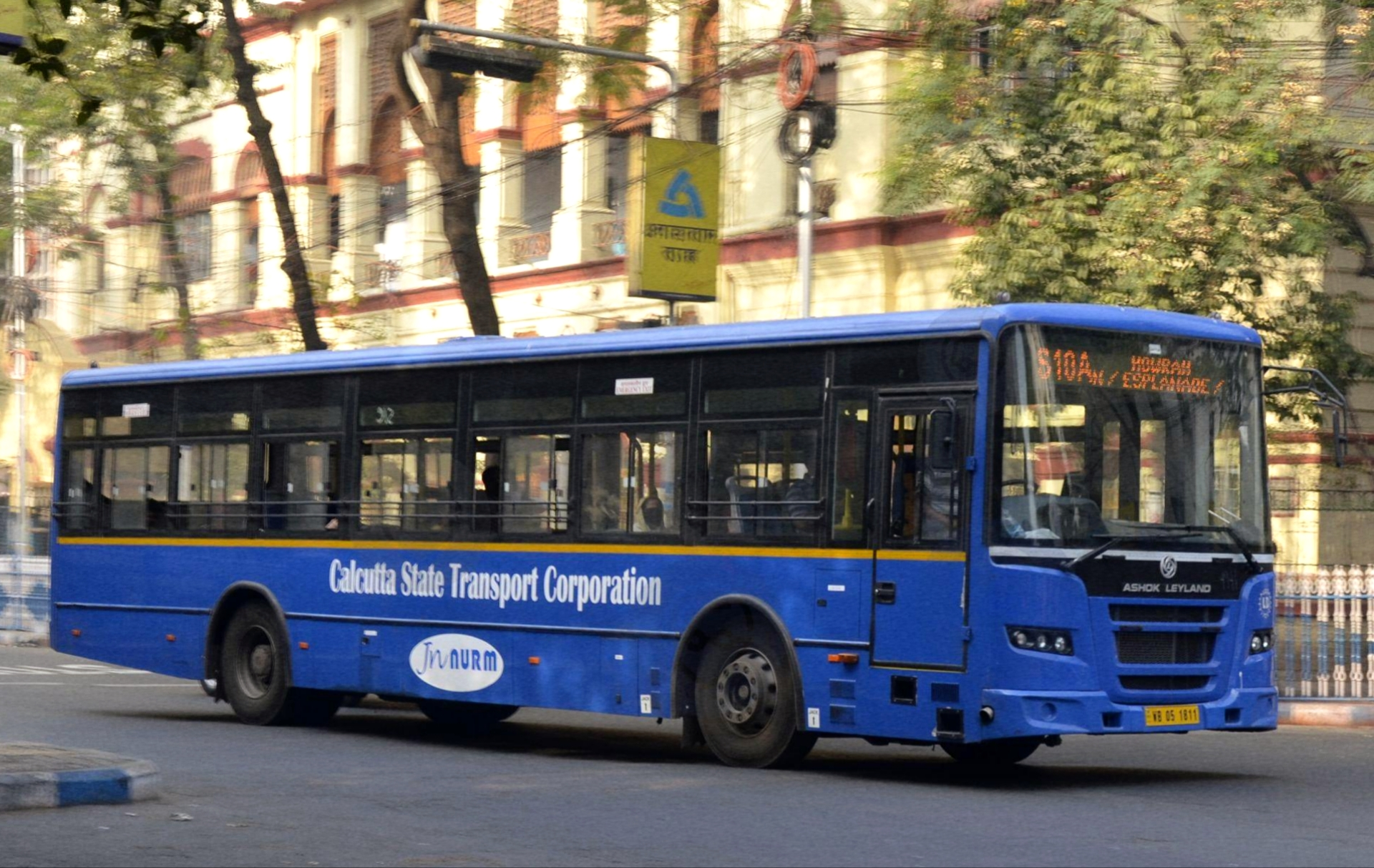
- CSTC Non AC Bus
- Founded: 31 July 1948; 78 years ago as State Transport Services
- Defunct: 2017
- Headquarters: Kolkata, West Bengal, India
- Service area: Kolkata; Long Distance Services was till 2015
- Service type: limited-stop, express bus service
- Depots: 11 till 2017
- Fleet: 782 till 2017
- Daily ridership: 20,00,000
- Operator: Government of West Bengal
- Website: wbtc.co.in

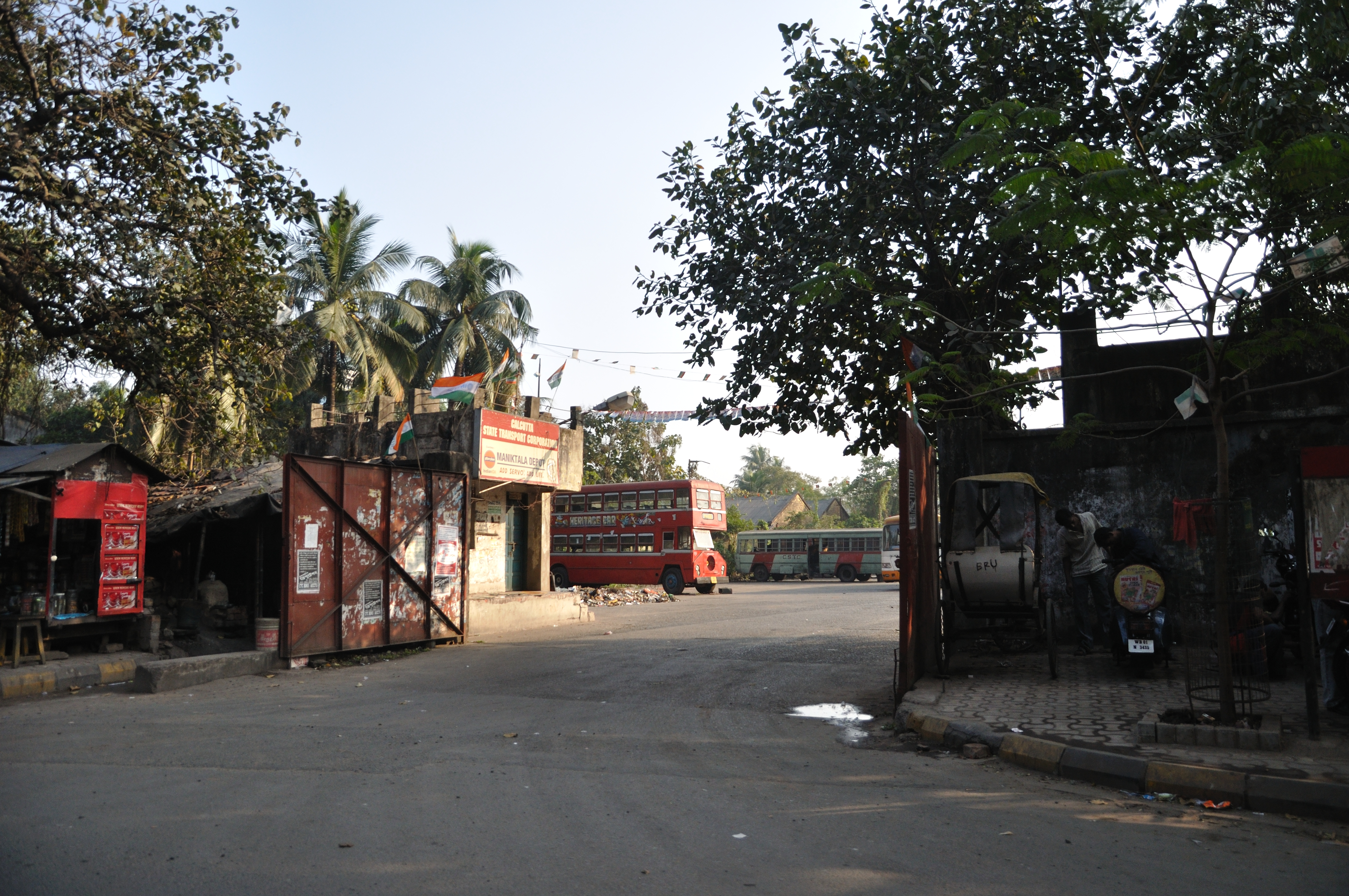
CSTC Maniktala bus depot, Kolkata.

Calcutta State Transport Corporation (CSTC) was a West Bengal state government undertaken corporation. Headquartered in Kolkata, it was set up on 31 July 1948. Currently it operates under the name WBTC. It plied buses in Kolkata and nearby districts of West Bengal, along with some long-distance services. CSTC owned 11 depots in Kolkata (then known as Calcutta).

== History ==
Calcutta State Transport Corporation started its journey on 31 July 1948 as State Transport Services with an objective to provide efficient, adequate, economical and properly coordinated passenger bus service particularly in and around the city of Kolkata and in the state of West Bengal in general.

On 15 June 1960 the name of State Transport Service changed to Calcutta State Transport Corporation (CSTC) under the Road Transport Corporation Act, 1950. By 1966, it had upgraded its services and was connected to 90 percent of the national highways. To fulfill the demand of rural passengers, CSTC introduced one of the earliest Long Distance Bus Services (LDS) from Calcutta to Digha in April 1968.

=== Merger with WBTC ===
In 2017, the Department of Transport (West Bengal) merged CSTC with other transport agencies such as CTC and WBSTC to form WBTC.

== Operations ==
=== Fleet ===
With a fleet of 782 buses, CSTC was able to set up a number of bus routes in the southern part of West Bengal which were till then not connected to any other means of formal public transport. CSTC also pioneered the running of air-conditioned Volvo buses in Kolkata, replacing the aging fleet.

Air conditioned buses were launched in July 2014 on 40 routes across the city and suburbs. They were in blue and white livery, the buses included a complete fleet of Volvo 8400 units as well as Tata Marcopolo, JanBus models from Ashok Leyland, the first low floor front entry public buses in the country. These were brought under the visionary of the central JNNURM scheme.

In 2019, the West Bengal state government made a decision to transition the city's bus fleet, along with its ferry fleet, to be entirely electric by 2030, to reduce the levels of air pollution in the city.

=== Depots ===
Former CSTC Depots were used for parking and repairing buses. The following depots were:

- 1 Belghoria Depot (Head Office) (BD)
- 2 Garia Depot (GD)
- 3 Howrah Depot (HD)
- 4 Kasba Depot (KD)
- 5 Lake Depot (LD)
- 6 Maniktala Depot (MD)
- 7 Nilgunge Depot (ND)
- 8 Paikpara Depot (PD)
- 9 Salt Lake Depot (SLD)
- 10 Taratala Depot (TD)
- 11 Thakurpukur Depot (TPD)
- 12 Pride Plaza Depot (PRD)
- 13 Shapoorji Depot

=== Bus Routes under CSTC ===
- AC1 Howrah Station – Jadavpur via Dalhousie, Park Street, Rabindra Sadan, Rashbehari, Tollygunge Phari, Prince Anwar Shah Road
- AC2 Howrah Station – Barasat via Barabazar, M.G. Road, Girish Park, Maniktala, Kankurgachi, Ultadanga, Kestopur, Baguihati, Airport Gate 1, B.T. College, Madhyamgram Chowmatha, Dakbungalow More, Champadali
- AC4 Howrah Station – Parnasree via Dalhousie, Park Street, Rabindra Sadan, P.G. Hospital, Khidderpore, Ekbalpore, Mominpore, Majherhat, Taratala
- AC4A Parnasree – Ecospace / Chittaranjan Cancer Institute via Taratala, New Alipore, Tollygunge Phari, Prince Anwar Shah Road, Lord's More, South City, Jadavpur P.S., Safuipara, Kalikapur, Ruby Hospital, Science City, Chingrighata, Nicco Park, SDF, Science City, Chingrighata, Nicco Park, SDF, College More, Technopolis, New Town, Narkelbagan, Tata Medical Centre, TCS Geetanjali Park
- AC4B Joka – New Town via Thakurpukur, Cancer Hospital, Kabardanga, Haridebpur, Tollygunge Tram Depot, Rashbehari, Gariahat, Ballygunge Station, Bosepukur, Ruby Hospital, Science City, Chingrighata, Nicco Park, SDF, College More, Technopolis
- AC5 Howrah Station – Garia via Dalhousie, Park Street, Rabindra Sadan, Rashbehari, Deshapriya Park, Gariahat, Golpark, Dhakuria, Jadavpur, Baghajatin
- AC6 Howrah Station – Garia via Dalhousie, Park Street, Rabindra Sadan, Rashbehari, Tollygunge Tram Depot, Ranikuthi, Bansdroni, Naktala
- AC9 Jadavpur – Salt Lake Karunamoyee via Santoshpur, Ajoynagar, Ruby Hospital, Science City, Beliaghata Building More, AMRI Hospital, GD Block, Central Park, City Centre, Bikash Bhawan
- AC9B Jadavpur – Ecospace via Santoshpur, Ajoynagar, Ruby Hospital, Science City, Chingrighata, College More, New Town, Narkelbagan, Tata Medical Centre, TCS Geetanjali Park
- AC12 Howrah Station – Shapoorji Housing Complex via Dalhousie, Park Street, Rabindra Sadan, Minto Park, Park Circus, 4 No. Bridge, 4 No. Bridge, Topsia, Science City, Chingrighata, College More, New Town, Narkelbagan, Unitech Gate 1, Karigori Bhawan, Kulberia
- AC12D Howrah Station – Thakurpukur via Dalhousie, Park Street, Rabindra Sadan, P.G. Hospital, Alipore Zoo, Bhabani Bhawan, Lalbati, Mominpore, Majherhat, Taratala, Behala Tram Depot, Behala Chowrasta, Sakherbazar, Sealpara
- AC14 Baruipur – Salt Lake Karunamoyee via Padmapukur, Harinavi, Rajpur, Narendrapur, Kamalgazi, Patuli, Ruby Hospital, Science City, Beliaghata Building More, AMRI Hospital, GD Block, Central Park
- AC23A Rajchandrapur – Salt Lake Karunamoyee via Bally Halt, Dakshineshwar, Dunlop, Mathkal, Durganagar, Airport Gate 1, Chinar Park, Akansha, Eco Park, Ecospace, TCS Geetanjali Park, Tata Medical Centre, Narkelbagan, New Town, Technopolis, College More
- AC24 Howrah Station – Patuli/Dhalai Bridge via Dalhousie, Park Street, Rabindra Sadan, Hazra, Rashbehari, Gariahat, Ballygunge Station, Bosepukur, Ruby Hospital, Hiland Park
- AC24A Howrah Station – Kamalgazi via Dalhousie, Park Street, Rabindra Sadan, Hazra, Rashbehari, Gariahat, Ballygunge Station, Bosepukur, Ruby Hospital, Hiland Park, Patuli, Dhalai Bridge
- AC30 Howrah Station – Lake Town via Barabazar, M.G. Road, Girish Park, Maniktala, Kankurgachi, Ultadanga, Lake Town VIP More, Jaya Cinema
- AC30S Ultadanga – Ecospace via E.M. Bypass, Chingrighata, College More, New Town, TCS Geetanjali Park
- AC31 Jadavpur – Behala Janakalyan via South City, Prince Anwar Shah Road, Tollygunge Tram Depot, Karunamoyee, Siriti, Muchipara, Sodepur, Motilal Gupta Road
- AC37 Barasat – Garia via Champadali, Madhyamgram Chowmatha, Airport Gate 1, Baguihati, Kestopur, Ultadanga, E.M. Bypass, Chingrighata, Science City, Ruby Hospital, Hiland Park, Patuli
- AC37A Airport Terminal – Garia via Kaikhali, Chinar Park, Eco Park, Narkelbagan, New Town, SDF, Chingrighata, Science City, Ruby Hospital, Hiland Park, Patuli
- AC37C Airport Terminal – Garia via Kaikhali, Baguihati, Kestopur, Ultadanga, E.M. Bypass, Chingrighata, Science City, Ruby Hospital, Hiland Park, Patuli
- AC39 Airport Terminal – Howrah Station via Kaikhali, Baguihati, Kestopur, Ultadanga, Kankurgachi, Maniktala, Girish Park, Central Avenue, Esplanade, Dalhousie, Barabazar
- AC40 Howrah Station – Airport via Barabazar, M.G. Road, Girish Park, Sovabazar, Shyambazar, R.G. Kar Hospital, Belgachia, Patipukur, Kalindi, Lake Town, Bangur Avenue, Diamond Plaza, Nagerbazar, Clive House, Central Jail, Gorabazar
- AC43 Airport Terminal – Golf Green via Kaikhali, Chinar Park, Eco Park, Narkelbagan, New Town, SDF, Chingrighata, Science City, Ruby Hospital, Kalikapur, Safuipara, Gangulypukur, Jadavpur P.S., South City, Lord's More
- AC47 Kudghat – Shapoorji Housing Complex via Tollygunge Tram Depot, Rashbehari, Gariahat, Ruby Hospital, Science City, Chingrighata, College More, New Town, Narkelbagan, Unitech Gate 1, Karigori Bhawan, Kulberia
- AC50 Belur Math – Garia via Ballykhal, Dakshineshwar, Dunlop, Durganagar, Airport Gate 1, Baguihati, Kestopur, Ultadanga, E.M. Bypass, Chingrighata, Science City, Ruby Hospital, Hiland Park, Patuli
- AC50A Rajchandrapur – Garia via Bally Halt, Dakshineshwar, Dunlop, Durganagar, Airport Gate 1, Baguihati, Kestopur, Ultadanga, E.M. Bypass, Chingrighata, Science City, Ruby Hospital, Hiland Park, Patuli
- AC52 Howrah Station – Amtala via Dalhousie, Fort Wiliam, Khidderpore, Ekbalpore, Mominpore, Majherhat, Taratala, Behala Tram Depot, Behala Chowrasta, Sakherbazar, Sealpara, Thakurpukur, Joka, Pailan, Bhasa 14 No., Khariberia, Bishnupur P.S.
- AC54 Howrah Station – Rathtala via Barabazar, M.G. Road, Central Avenue, Girish Park, Sovabazar, Shyambazar, Sinthee More, Dunlop
- AC54B Howrah Station – Barrackpore Court via Barabazar, M.G. Road, Central Avenue, Girish Park, Shyambazar, Sinthee More, Dunlop, Kamarhati, Sodepur, Khardah, Titagarh, Barrackpore Station, Dhobi Ghat
- AC57 Barajagulia – Salt Lake Karunamoyee via AIIMS, Kalyani Station, Central Park, Buddha Park, Kampa More, Saheb Colony, Keutia More, Wireless More, Muragachha, Nimta More, Mathkal, Airport Gate 3, Chinar Park, Eco Park, Narkelbagan, New Town, College More
- AC58 Sonarpur Liver Foundation Hospital – Ecospace via Sonarpur Station, Kamalgazi, Dhalai Bridge, Ruby Hospital, Science City, Chingrighata, College More, New Town, TCS Geetanjali Park
- AC59 Bagkhal – Salt Lake Karunamoyee via Konnagar, Dharsha, Uttarpara, Ballykhal, Dakshineshwar, Dunlop, Mathkal, Durganagar, Airport Gate 3, Chinar Park, Eco Park, Narkelbagan, New Town, College More
- AC60 Howrah Maidan – Sonarpur Liver Foundation Hospital via Howrah Station, Esplanade, Moulali, Sealdah, Beliaghata, Chingrighata, Science City, Bantala Bazar, Kheyadaha Bazar, Tihuria, Gangajoara Bridge, Sonarpur Station, Ghasiara
- M14 Behala – New Town via Roy Bahadur Road, Chanditala, Buroshibtala, New Alipore, Chetla, Rashbehari, Gariahat, Ballygunge Station, Bosepukur, Ruby Hospital, Science City, Chingrighata, Nicco Park, SDF, College More, Technopolis
- S2 Howrah Station – Kudghat via Dalhousie, Park Street, Rabindra Sadan, Rashbehari, Tollygunge Tram Depot
- S2B Bagbazar – Ballygunge Station via Shyambazar, Hatibagan, College Street/Amherst Street, Esplanade, Rabindra Sadan, Rashbehari, Gariahat
- S3A Sealdah – Thakurpukur via Bowbazar, Dalhousie, Eden Gardens, Babughat, Prinsep Ghat, Khidderpore, Ekbalpore, Mominpore, Majherhat, Taratala, Behala Tram Depot, Behala Chowrasta, Sakherbazar, Sealpara
- S3B Kankurgachi – Behala via Maniktala, Rajabazar, Sealdah, Bowbazar, Dalhousie, Eden Gardens, Babughat, Prinsep Ghat, Khidderpore, Ekbalpore, Mominpore, Majherhat, Taratala, Behala Tram Depot
- S3W Joka – Ecospace via Thakurpukur, Sakherbazar, Behala Chowrasta, Behala Tram Depot, Taratala, New Alipore, Chetla, Rashbehari, Gariahat, Ballygunge Station, Bosepukur, Ruby Hospital, Science City, Chingrighata, Nicco Park, SDF, College More, Technopolis, New Town, Narkelbagan, Tata Medical Centre, TCS Geetanjali Park
- S4 Parnasree – Salt Lake Karunamoyee via Taratala, New Alipore, Tollygunge Phari, Rashbehari, Gariahat, Ballygunge Station, Bosepukur, Ruby Hospital, Science City, Beliaghata Building More, Salt Lake Stadium, PNB More, Baisakhi, Bikash Bhawan
- S4C Howrah Station – Haridebpur via Dalhousie, Park Street, Rabindra Sadan, Rashbehari, Tollygunge Tram Depot, Karunamoyee
- S4D Parnasree – Ecospace/Chittaranjan Cancer Institute via Taratala, New Alipore, Tollygunge Phari, Prince Anwar Shah Road, Lord's More, South City, Jadavpur P.S., Safuipara, Kalikapur, Ruby Hospital, Science City, Chingrighata, Nicco Park, SDF, Science City, Chingrighata, Nicco Park, SDF, College More, Technopolis, New Town, Narkelbagan, Tata Medical Centre, TCS Geetanjali Park
- S5 Howrah Station – Garia via Dalhousie, Park Street, Rabindra Sadan, Hazra, Rashbehari, Deshapriya Park, Golpark, Dhakuria, Jadavpur, Baghajatin
- S7 Howrah Station – Garia via Dalhousie, Park Street, Rabindra Sadan, Hazra, Rashbehari, Tollygunge Tram Depot, Ranikuthi, Bansdroni, Naktala
- S8B Howrah Station – Jadavpur via Dalhousie, Park Street, Rabindra Sadan, Hazra, Rashbehari, Deshapriya Park, Golpark, Dhakuria
- S9 Jadavpur – Salt Lake Karunamoyee via Santoshpur, Ajoynagar, Ruby Hospital, Science City, Beliaghata Building More, AMRI Hospital, GD Block, Central Park
- S9A Dunlop – Ballygunge Station via Sinthee More, Chiria More, Shyambazar, Sovabazar, Girish Park, Central Avenue, Esplanade, Rabindra Sadan, Hazra, Rashbehari, Gariahat
- S9C Kamalgazi – Ecospace via Dhalai Bridge, Ruby Hospital, Science City, Chingrighata, College More, New Town, TCS Geetanjali Park
- S10 Nabanna – Airport Gate 3 via Mandirtala, Rabindra Sadan, Eplanade, Central Avenue, Girish Park, Sovabazar, Shyambazar, Chiria More, Dum Dum Station, Nagerbazar, Central Jail, Gorabazar, Airport Gate 1
- S10A Howrah Station – Ballygunge Station via Dalhousie, Park Street, Rabindra Sadan, Hazra, Rashbehari, Gariahat
- S11 Esplanade – Nilganj Depot via Central Avenue, Girish Park, Shyambazar, Sinthee More, Dunlop, Kamarhati, Sodepur, Khardah, Titagarh, Barrackpore Station, Wireless More
- S11B Esplanade – Barrackpore Court via Central Avenue, Girish Park, Shyambazar, Sinthee More, Dunlop, Kamarhati, Sodepur, Khardah, Titagarh, Barrackpore Station, Dhobi Ghat
- S12 Howrah Station – New Town via Esplanade, Moulali, Sealdah, Beliaghata, Chingrighata, College More, Technopolis
- S12D Howrah Station – Thakurpukur via Dalhousie, Fort Wiliam, Khidderpore, Ekbalpore, Mominpore, Majherhat, Taratala, Behala Tram Depot, Behala Chowrasta, Sakherbazar, Sealpara
- S12E Howrah Station – Ecospace/Eco Urban Village via Esplanade, Moulali, Sealdah, Beliaghata, Chingrighata, College More, Technopolis, New Town, Narkelbagan, TCS Geetanjali Park, Aliah University, Kadampukur, Malancha Housing, Hiland Willows
- S14 Garia – Salt Lake Karunamoyee via Patuli, Ruby Hospital, Science City, Beliaghata Building More, AMRI Hospital, GD Block, Central Park
- S15G Dakshineswar – Baruipur via Bonhooghly, Sinthee More, Chiria More, Shyambazar, Sovabazar, Girish Park, Central Avenue, Esplanade, Rabindra Sadan, Hazra, Rashbehari, Gariahat, Dhakuria, Jadavpur, Baghajatin, Padmasree, Garia Bus Stand, Mahamayatala, Kamalgazi, Narendrapur, Rajpur, Harinavi, Haraharitala, Gobindapur, Jogibattala, Padmapukur, Shibanipith
- S16 Thakurpukur –Salt Lake Karunamoyee via Sealpara, Sakherbazar, Behala Chowrasta, Behala Tram Depot, Majherhat, Mominpore, Ekbalpore, Khidderpore, Hastings, Esplanade, Moulali, Sealdah, Rajabazar, Maniktala, Kankurgachi, Ultadanga
- S17A Ariadaha – Kudghat via Dakshineshwar, Bonhooghly, Baranagar Bazar, Kashipur, Bagbazar, Central Avenue, Esplanade, Rabindra Sadan, Hazra, Rashbehari, Tollygunge
- S21 Bagbazar – Garia via Shyambazar, Ultadanga, Kankurgachi, Phoolbagan, Beliaghata CIT More, ID Hospital, Beliaghata Building More, Chingrighata, Science City, Rubny Hospital, Ajoyangar, Hiland Park, Patuli, Baishnabghata
- S21A Bagbazar – Garia via Shyambazar, Ultadanga, Bengal Chemical, Mani Square, Apollo Hospital, Kadapara, Beliaghata Building More, Chingrighata, Science City, Rubny Hospital, Ajoyangar, Hiland Park, Patuli, Baishnabghata
- S22 Shakuntala Park – Salt Lake Karunamoyee via Bakultala, Behala Chowrasta, Behala Tram Depot, Taratala, New Alipore, Chetla, Rashbehari, Gariahat, Ballygunge Station, Bosepukur, Ruby Hospital, Science City, Chingrighata, Nicco Park, SDF, College More
- S23A Rajchandrapur – Salt Lake Karunamoyee via Bally Halt, Dakshineshwar, Dunlop, Mathkal, Durganagar, Airport Gate 1, Chinar Park, Akansha, Eco Park, Narkelbagan, New Town, Technopolis, College More
- S24 Howrah Station – Kamalgazi via Barabazar, Dalhousie, Esplanade, Moulali, CIT Road, Chittaranjan Hospital, 4 No. Bridge, Topsia, Science City, VIP Bazar, Ruby Hospital, Kalikapur, Ajoynagar, Hiland Park, Patuli, Dhalai Bridge
- S30 Ultadanga – Ecospace via E.M. Bypass, Chingrighata, College More, New Town, TCS Geetanjali Park
- S30A Ultadanga – Salt Lake Sector-V via City Centre, Bikash Bhawan, Karunamoyee, Wipro More, College More, SDF
- S30P Ultadanga – Salt Lake Sector-V via PNB More, Labony, Anindita More, GD Island, Homeopathy Hospital, Nicco Park, Wipro More, College More, SDF
- S31 Jadavpur – Behala Janakalyan via South City, Prince Anwar Shah Road, Tollygunge Tram Depot, Karunamoyee, Siriti, Muchipara, Sodepur, Motilal Gupta Road
- S32 Howrah Station – Barrackpore Court via Central Avenue, Girish Park, Shyambazar, Sinthee More, Dunlop, Kamarhati, Sodepur, Khardah, Titagarh, Barrackpore Station, Barrackpore Cantonment, Dhobi Ghat
- S32A Howrah Station – Dunlop via Central Avenue, Girish Park, Sovabazar, Shyambazar, Chiria More, Sinthee More, Bonhooghly
- S33A Paikpara – Park Circus via Shyambazar, Maniktala, Sealdah, Moulali, CIT Road, Chittaranjan Hospital
- S34B West Bengal State University – Barrackpore Court via Jagannathpur, Nilgunge Hat, Mohanpur, Wireless More, Lalkuthi, Barrackpore Station, Barrackpore Cantonment, Dhobi Ghat
- S37A Airport – Garia Bus Stand via Kaikhali, Baguihati, Kestopur, Ultadanga, E.M. Bypass, Chingrighata, Science City, Ruby Hospital, Hiland Park, Patuli
- S39A Santragachi – Sealdah via Baksara, Belepole, Carry Road, Nabanna Toll, Vidyasagar Setu, Hastings, Rabindra Sadan, Esplanade, Moulali
- S45 Shakuntala Park – Bagbazar (Kolkata Station) via Bakultala, Behala Chowrasta, Behala Tram Depot, Majherhat, Mominpore, Ekbalpore, Kothari Hospital, Alipore Zoo, Hastings, Rabindra Sadan, Esplanade, Moulali, Sealdah, Rajabazar, Maniktala, Shyambazar
- S46 Akra Rabindranagar – Salt Lake Karunamoyee via Santoshpur Station, Nature Park, Jinjira Bazar, Brace Bridge, Taratala, New Alipore, Chetla, Rashbehari, Gariahat, Ballygunge Station, Bosepukur, Ruby Hospital, Science City, Chingrighata, Beliaghata Building More, AMRI Hospital, GD Island, Central Park
- S47 Howrah Station – Eden City via Dalhousie, Fort Wiliam, Khidderpore, Ekbalpore, Mominpore, Majherhat, Taratala, Brace Bridge, Jinjira Bazar, Mollar Gate, Rampur, Dakghar, Bata More
- S47A Howrah Station – Behala Airport via Dalhousie, Fort Wiliam, Khidderpore, Ekbalpore, Mominpore, Majherhat, Taratala, Brace Bridge, Jinjira Bazar, Parnasree
- S50B Jadavpur – Belur Math via Dhakuria, Gariahat, Ballygunge Phari, Park Circus, Mullickbazar, Sealdah, Moulali, Maniktala, Vivekananda Road, Girish Park, Sovabazar, Shyambazar, Chiria More, Sinthee More, Bonhooghly, Dunlop, Dakshineshwar, Ballykhal
- S57 Ariadaha – Nabanna via Adyapith, Dakshineshwar, Dunlop, Sinthee More, Chiria More, Shyambazar, Girish Park, Central Avenue, Lalbazar, Dalhousie, Park Street, Rabindra Sadan, P.G. Hospital, Hastings, Vidyasagar Setu, Toll Plaza
- S61 BBD Bagh – Achipur via Khidderpore, Mominpore, Majherhat, Taratala, Brace Bridge, Mollar Gate, Rampur, Dakghar, Bata More, Eden City, Shyampur, Budge Budge, Plaster More, Charial Bazar, Pujali
- S66 Howrah Station – Choto Finga via Barabazar, M.G. Road, Girish Park, Maniktala, Kankurgachi, Ultadanga, Kestopur, Baguihati, Airport Gate 1, Bankra More, Bisharpara Railgate
- S67 Bagbazar – Salt Lake Tank No.8 via Rajballavpara, Shyambazar, Khanna, Ultadanga, PNB More, City Centre, Bikash Bhawan, Karunamoyee
- S68 Ballygunge Station – Alipore Zoo via Gariahat, Rashbehari, Hazra, Bhawanipore, Rabindra Sadan, Alipore, Gopal Nagar
- S70 Barrackpore Court – Kanchrapara Bijpur P.S. via Barrackpore Station, Ichapur Rifle Factory, Jagaddal Bazar, Kankinara Station, Naihati, Halisahar Kona More, Bag More, Gandhi More
- S71 Khardaha – Nabanna via Sodepur Traffic More, Kamarhati, Dunlop, Sinthee More, Chiria More, Shyambazar, Girish Park, Central Avenue, Esplanade, Rabindra Sadan, P.G. Hospital, Hastings, Vidyasagar Setu, Toll Plaza
