= Economy of Kolkata =

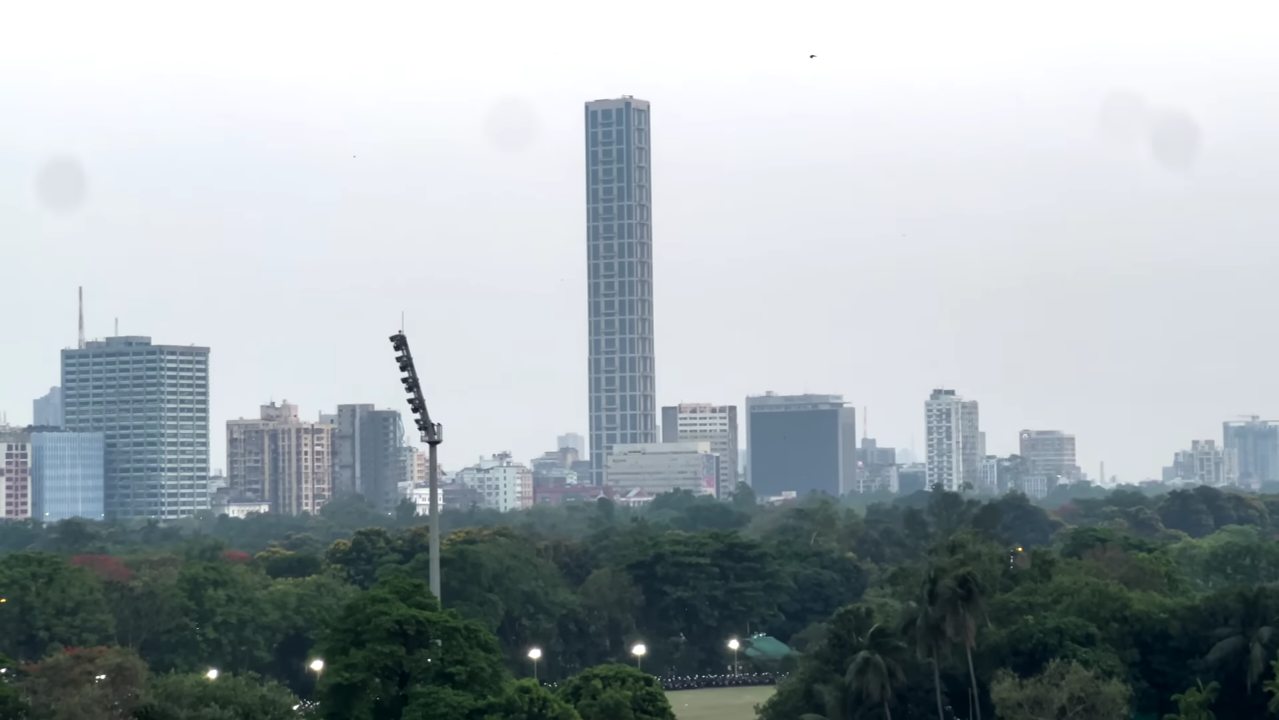
- Central Business District of Kolkata
- Currency: Indian Rupee (INR, ₹)
- Fiscal year: 1 April – 31 March

Statistics
- Population: 2011 census: ▼4,496,694 (city proper) ▲14,112,536 (metro) ▲14,617,882 (Extended UA); 2023 estimate: ▲6,200,000 (city proper) ▲15,333,000 (metro)
- GDP: ▲US$224 billion GDP (PPP)
- GDP growth: ▲11.54%
- GDP per capita: $14,348 (PPP)
- Population below poverty line: ▼2.54%
- Human Development Index: ▲0.917
- Main industries: Coal; Steel; Manufacturing; Leather; IT; Food processing Textile

External
- Exports: ₹38,917 crore (US$4.1 billion)
- All values, unless otherwise stated, are in US dollars.

Kolkata is the prime business, commercial and financial hub of eastern India and the main hub of communication for the North East Indian states. Kolkata, with a GDP (PPP) of US$224 billion is home to India's oldest, stock exchange company (bourse) – The Calcutta Stock Exchange. Kolkata is home to many industrial units operated by large public- and private-sector corporations; major sectors include steel, heavy engineering, mining, minerals, cement, pharmaceuticals, food processing, agriculture, electronics, textiles, and jute.

== Background ==
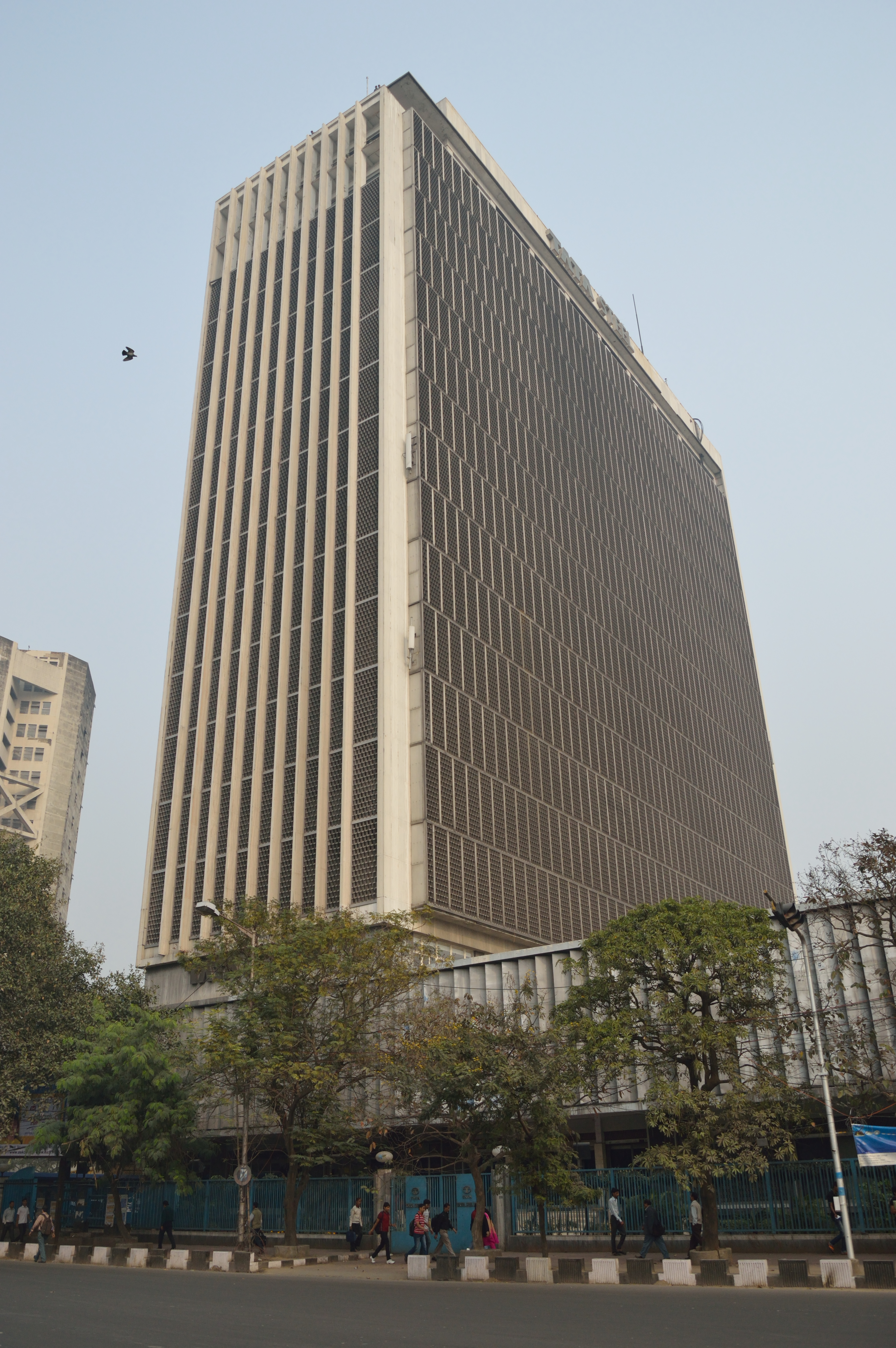
Tata Centre, JL Nehru Road

Kolkata was the capital of the British Indian Empire until 1911. Throughout the British Raj, the city was a major port and commercial center in the world economy. The Partition of India in 1947 was a major blow to the once flourishing economy during the world wars, it removed most of the hinterland, cutting down the supply of the human resource and a took away a huge portion of its market. Also the huge inflow of refugee from East Pakistan was a major drain to the city's infrastructure which was inadequate for the population boom. In the 1970s, the city saw a predominance of the trade-union movements which led the investors to flow out of the state to other newly emerging destinations in India. As the investors lacked trust in the newly formed communist government, the lack of capital destroyed most of its small-scale industries like foundries and tool casting. Once India's leading city, Kolkata experienced a steady economic decline in the decades following India's independence due to steep population increases and a rise in militant trade-unionism, which included frequent strikes that were backed by left-wing parties. From the 1960s to the late 1990s, several factories were closed and businesses relocated. The lack of capital and resources added to the depressed state of the city's economy and gave rise to an unwelcome sobriquet: the "dying city".

There are a few of the oldest and front line banks and PSUs —such as UCO Bank, Allahabad Bank, United Bank of India and Geological Survey of India, Zoological Survey of India, Botanical Survey of India and Tea Board of India—were founded and is headquartered in Kolkata. The oldest operating photographic studio in the world, Bourne & Shepherd, is also based in the city. The Standard Chartered Bank has a major branch in Kolkata. Kolkata is also the headquarters of Botanical Survey of India and Zoological Survey of India and many more organisations and companies. Kolkata is 3rd richest city in India after Mumbai & New Delhi as well as in South Asia.

Kolkata is home to many industrial units operated by large public sector and private-sector corporations; major sectors include steel, heavy engineering, mining, minerals, cement, pharmaceuticals, food processing, agriculture, electronics, textiles, and jute.

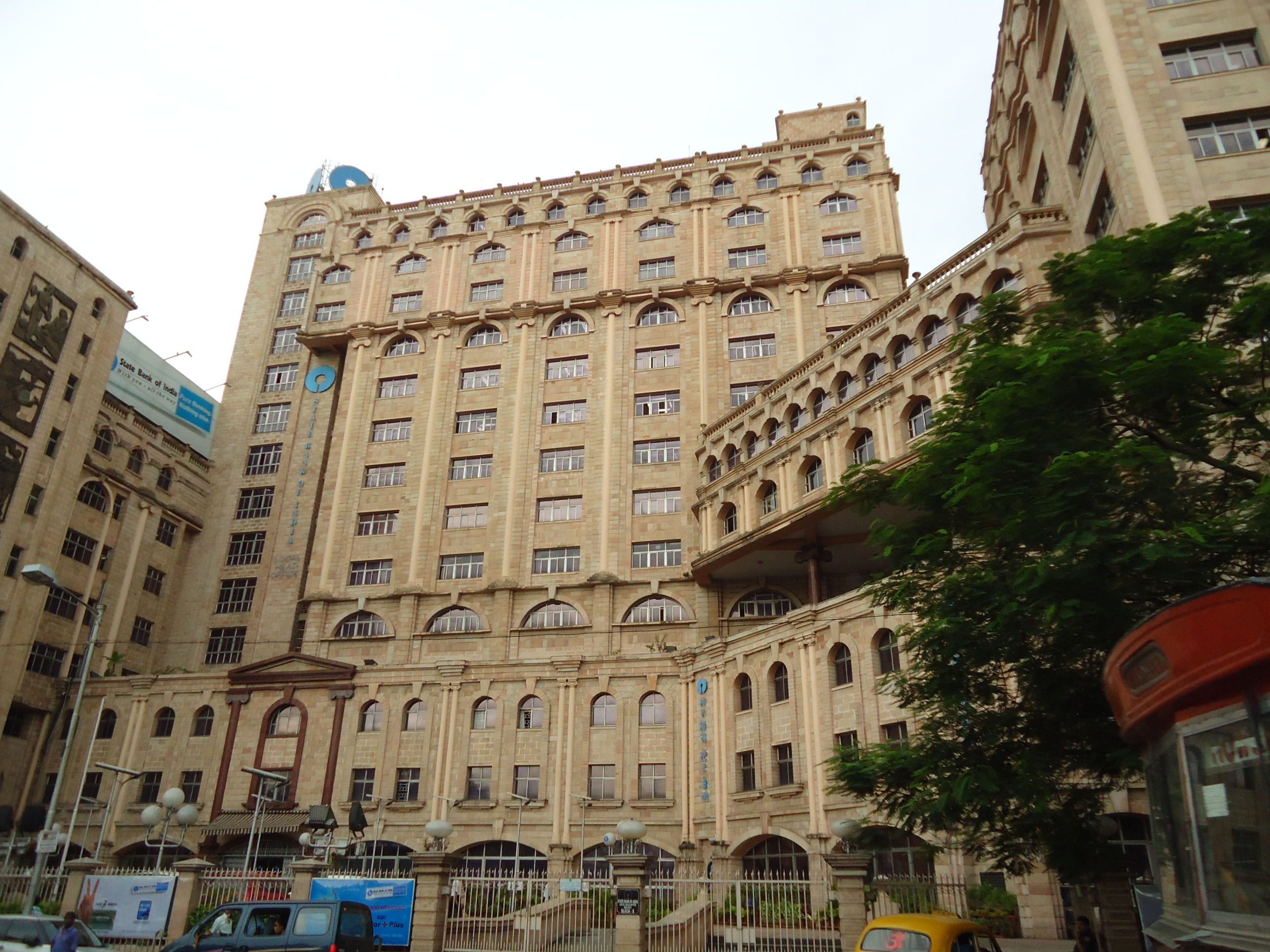
SBI Regional HQ, Strand Road

== Sectors ==
Flexible production has been the norm in Kolkata, which has an informal sector that employs more than 40% of the labour force. Over the years, the informal sector has grown in size and as a proportion of the total workforce of the Kolkata metropolitan area. One unorganised group, roadside hawkers, generated business worth ₹ 87.72 billion (US$ 2 billion) in 2005. As of 2001, around 0.81% of the city's workforce was employed in the primary sector (agriculture, forestry, mining, etc.); 15.49% worked in the secondary sector (industrial and manufacturing); and 83.69% worked in the tertiary sector (service industries). As of 2003, the majority of households in slums were engaged in occupations belonging to the informal sector; 36.5% were involved in servicing the urban middle class (as maids, drivers, etc.), and 22.2% were casual labourers. About 34% of the available labour force in Kolkata slums were unemployed. Since 2017, warehousing industry in the vicinity of the city experienced significant increase, and was the fastest growing market in India, per 2019 report.

== Major companies based in Kolkata ==
Kolkata is home to many industrial units operated by large public- and private-sector corporations; major sectors include steel, heavy engineering, mining, minerals, cement, pharmaceuticals, food processing, agriculture, electronics, textiles, and jute.

Companies such as ITC Limited, ABP Group, CESC Limited, Exide Industries, Emami, Eveready Industries India, Senco Gold Limited, Lux Industries, Rupa Company, Berger Paints, Patton International Limited, Birla Corporation, Khaitan India Ltd., Peerless Group and Britannia Industries, Jai Balaji group, Shyam Steel Industries Limited are all headquartered in the city. Philips India, PricewaterhouseCoopers India, Tata Global Beverages, Tata Steel have their registered office and zonal headquarters in Kolkata. Some of the oldest public sector companies are headquartered in the city such as the Coal India Limited, National Insurance Company, Garden Reach Shipbuilders & Engineers, Tea Board of India, Geological Survey of India, Zoological Survey of India, Botanical Survey of India, Jute Corporation of India, National Test House, Hindustan Copper and the Ordnance Factories Board of the Indian Ministry of Defence, Damodar Valley Corporation and India Govt. Mint are also headquartered in the city. Kolkata hosts the headquarters of three major public-sector banks: Allahabad Bank, UCO Bank, and the United Bank of India and India's one of the newest private banks Bandhan Bank.

Among these three of the Forbes Global 2000 listed companies are headquartered in Kolkata, which includes ITC Limited, Coal India, Allahabad Bank and UCO Bank.

== Banking ==
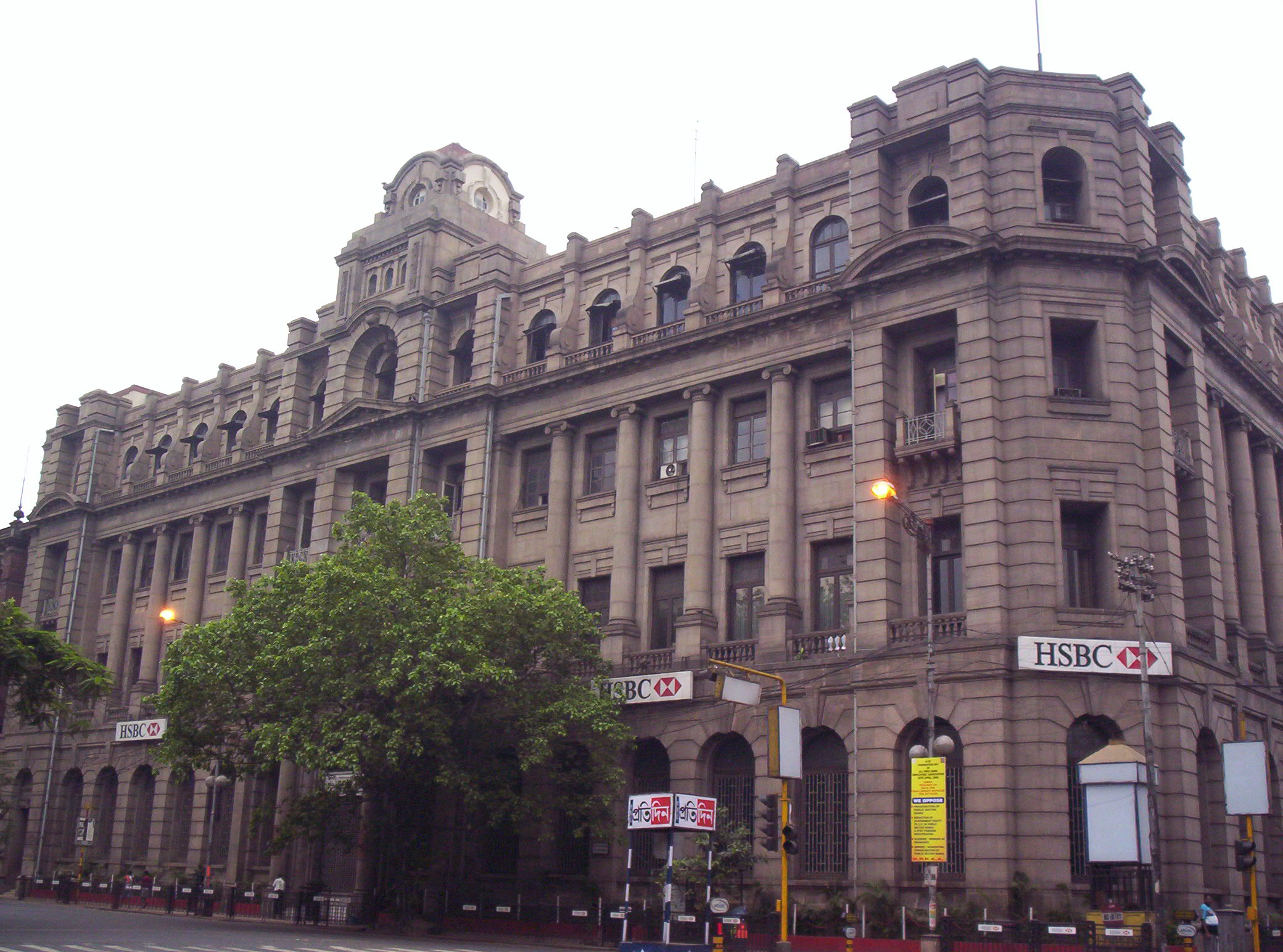
HSBC in Kolkata

Kolkata is an important centre for banking. At present, the city serves as the headquarters of large nationalised bank UCO Bank and a private scheduled bank - Bandhan Bank. Several large financial companies and insurance companies are headquartered in Kolkata including Magma Fincorp, Bandhan Bank, SREI Infrastructure Finance, National Insurance Company. Many Indian banks, multi-national banks and the World Bank have located their Branch offices operations in the city. All main banks from India have their branch office here. Also big financial banks like Standard Chartered Bank, Bank of America and HSBC Bank have office and branches in Kolkata. Bandhan Financial, the largest Microfinance Group in India from Kolkata and 2nd largest of its kind in the World has got RBI's nod to set up banks all over India. Bandhan Bank has its Head Office in Kolkata, which is the only bank after independence to be established in the city.

== Infrastructure ==
=== Power and energy ===
The electricity supply in Kolkata is mainly done by CESC Limited and WBSEDCL.

CESC is the sole distribution company serving 567 square kilometres (219 sq mi) of area administered by the Kolkata municipal corporation, in the city of Kolkata, as well as parts of Howrah, Hooghly, 24 Parganas (North) and 24 Parganas (South) districts. CESC also has its own Transmission & Distribution system through which it supplies electricity to its consumers. This system comprises a 474-kilometre (295 mi) circuit of transmission lines linking the company's generating and receiving stations with 85 distribution stations; a 3,837-kilometre (2,384 mi) circuit of HT lines further linking distribution stations with LT substations, large industrial consumers and a 9,867-kilometre (6,131 mi) circuit of LT lines connecting its LT substations to LT consumers.

West Bengal State Electricity Distribution Company Limited (WBSEDCL) is a wholly owned enterprise of Government of West Bengal, established in 2007 as one of the two successors of West Bengal State Electricity Board, and is responsible for providing power to 96% of West Bengal which is not covered by CESC.

=== Communication and transportation ===
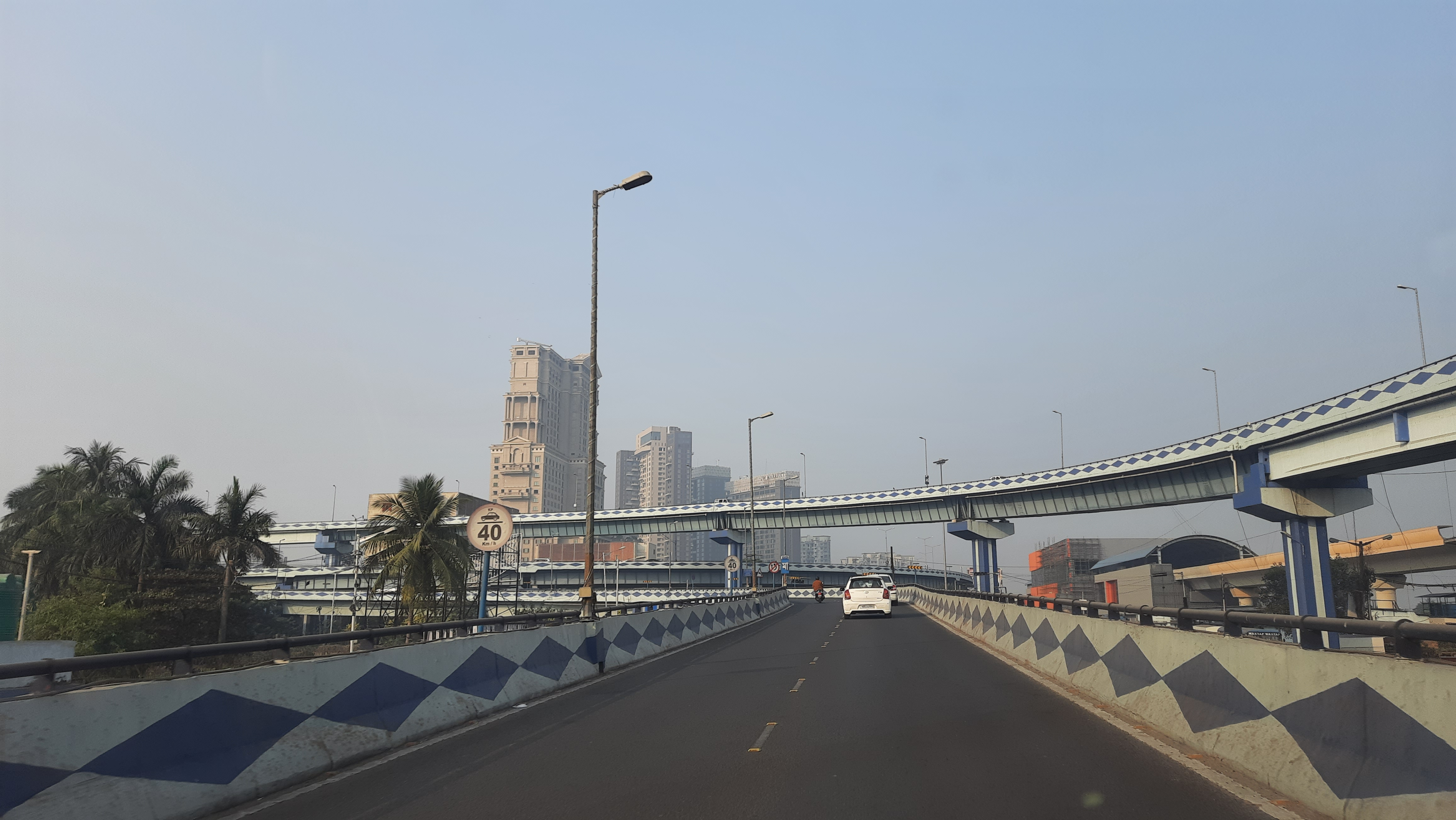
Maa Flyover

Kolkata has excellent roads with numerous flyovers which add to the convenience of commuters. A network of expressways like Kona Expressway, Kalyani Expressway, Belghoria Expressway, flyovers and widening of southern stretch of Eastern Metropolitan Bypass are being created to ease up road traffic. Maa Flyover is an important flyover in Kolkata.

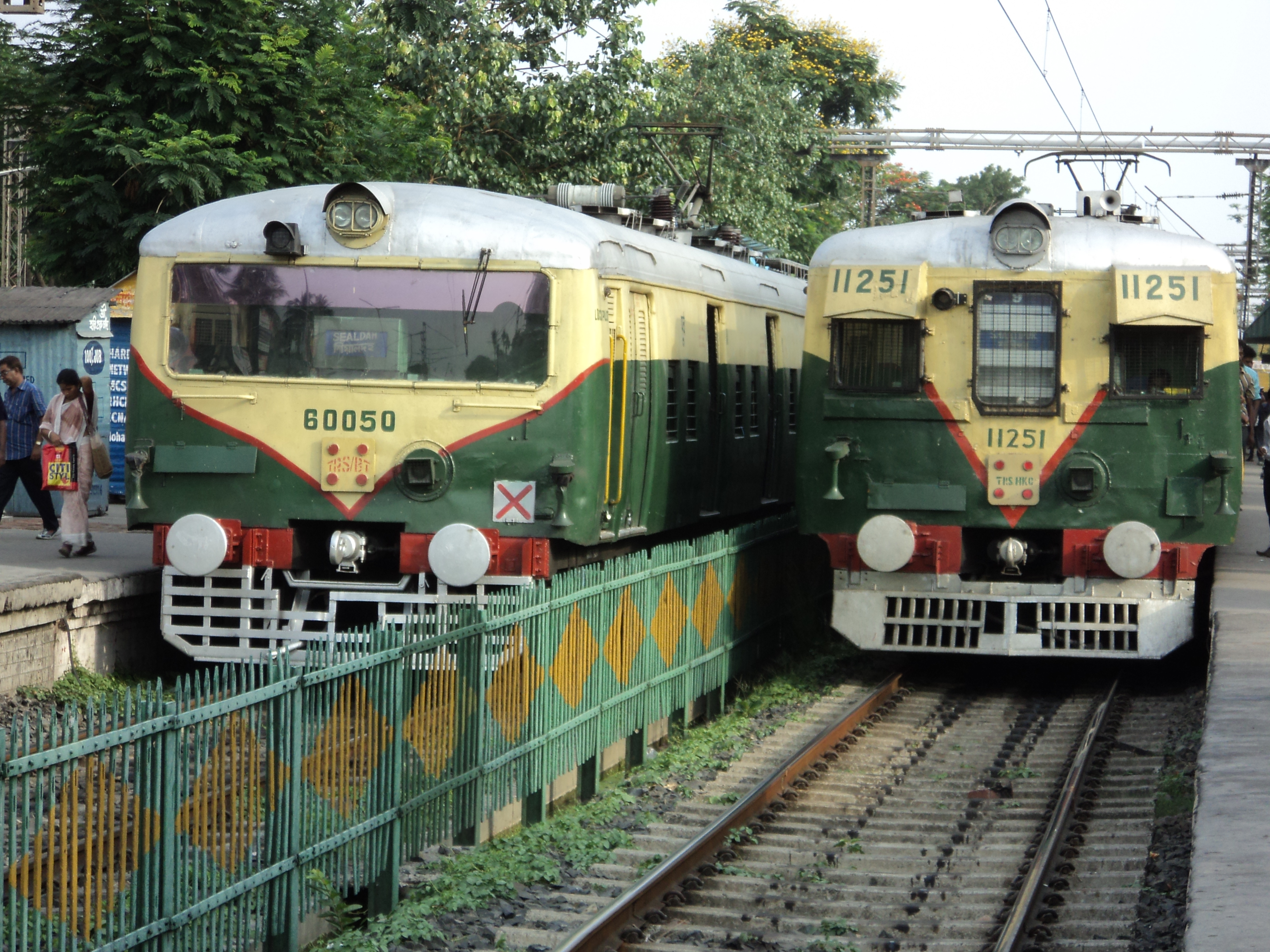
Eastern Railway Local Trains

A large network of roads are spread over in Kolkata which helps to reduce traffic congestion. Elevated roads are present in New Town and Rajarhat area of Kolkata. Kolkata is connected to other parts of India by the National Highways 2, 6, 34, and 117. The Belghoria Expressway connects NH 34 with NH 2 and 6 via the Nivedita Setu while the NH 117 is connected to NH 6 by the Kona Expressway via the Vidyasagar Setu.

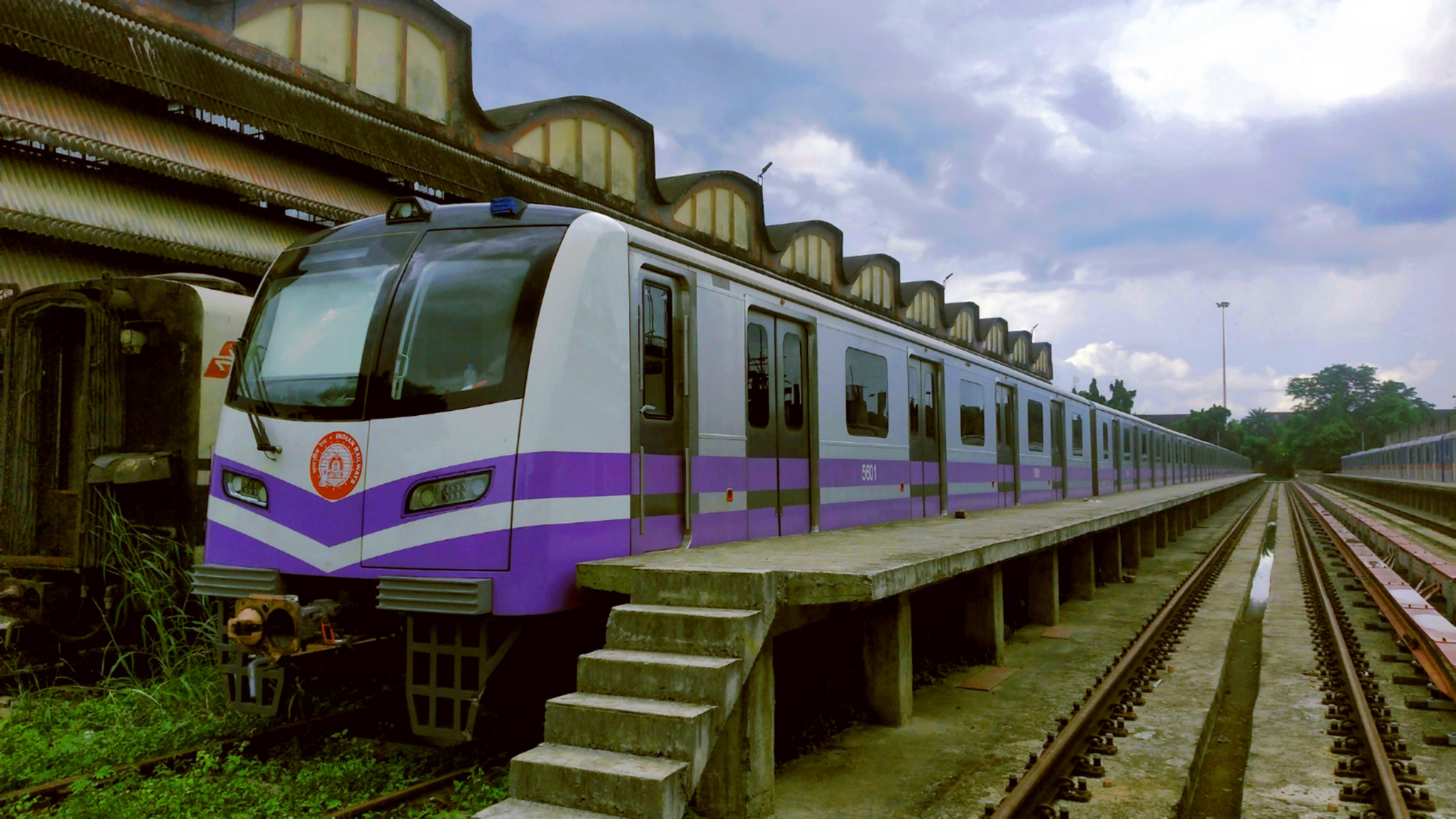
Kolkata Metro CRRC Dalian rake

Kolkata is well-connected to the rest of India by an extensive railway network of the Indian railways. Two divisions of the Indian railways - the Eastern Railway and the South Eastern Railway - are headquartered in the city. A total of five railway stations serve Kolkata. The two major railway stations of the city are at Howrah and Sealdah. The third station is called Kolkata has recently been constructed. International trains such as Maitree Express and Bandhan Express depart from Kolkata Station. The fourth station is Santragachi Junction which operates weekly and bi-weekly express trains to ease pressure on Howrah junction. The fifth station is named Shalimar Railway Station which used to be a goods yard has been transformed into a station from where mail and express trains operate. The Circular Rail encircles the entire city of Kolkata, starting and terminating at Dum Dum Junction.

Kolkata was the first city in South Asia to have an underground railway system that started operating in 1984. Kolkata Metro is jointly owned by Metro Railway, Kolkata and Kolkata Metro Rail Corporation. It has four operational lines of total length of about 60 km. As of 2024, various other metro links of approximately 74 km route length are underway in different phases of construction in Kolkata.

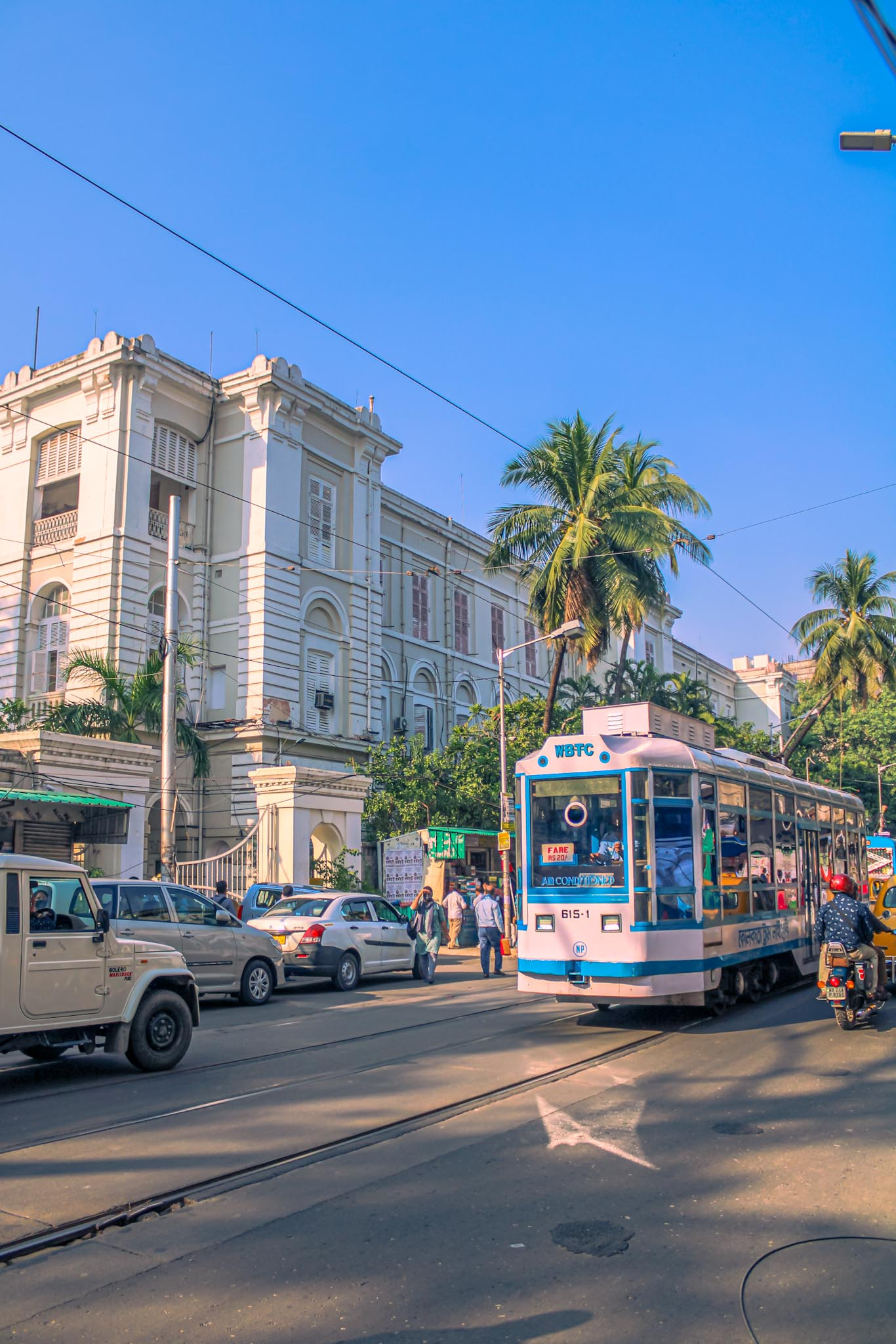
Tram in Kolkata

Kolkata is the only city in India to have a tram network. Trams are under the administration of the Calcutta Tramways Company, a government of West Bengal Undertaking, popularly called CTC (now merged with West Bengal Transport Corporation). The environment-friendliness and the age-old charm of the trams attract some people. Now, several initiatives have started to improve the tram's popularity as well as increasing revenues. The results are positive. The Tram Museum is the latest addition to such schemes, which also include heritage trams' small models and meals on wheels trams i.e. with dining options. 1st AC passenger tram ran in the city in 2019. Each of the AC trams, built at the Nonapukur tram depot near Muzaffar Ahmed Sarani, cost Rs 25 lakh and is fitted with a 5.5 tonne AC unit, LED light bulbs and fans.

The government buses were previously run by Calcutta State Transport Corporation, Calcutta Tramways Company, West Bengal Surface Transport Corporation, North Bengal State Transport Corporation and South Bengal State Transport Corporation. In the year 2016, the first three government bus companies merged and formed West Bengal Transport Corporation. The government buses are generally painted either blue color with white stripes or white color with blue stripes. This buses are identified by the WBTC symbol on the front windscreen and on their body. Both the name of the destination place as well as the name of the originating place is mentioned on the front of the bus either digitally [LED Board] or written [White Board]. The fleet consist of Ashok Leyland JanBus, Tata Motors Marcopolo Bus, and Volvo 8400 buses and Eicher Starline buses. Air-conditioned buses have been introduced in the year 2009 under Jawaharlal Nehru National Urban Renewal Mission (JNNURM) and are operated by WBTC. Air-conditioned buses have been included to provide comfort to daily commuters to make there travel less tiresome. In the year 2019, electric AC buses were introduced. Tata Motors were given contract by Government Of West Bengal to supply 80 such buses to WBTC. Non-AC buses fare start from ₹10 (10¢ US) whereas AC buses fare start from ₹25 (26¢ US).

=== Ports ===
Kolkata is a major river-port in eastern India. The Kolkata Port Trust manages both the Kolkata docks and the Haldia docks. There is passenger service to Port Blair on the Andaman and Nicobar Islands and cargo ship service to ports in India and abroad, operated by the Shipping Corporation of India. Kolkata Port handled 65.660 million tonnes (mt) of traffic in 2022-23, around 12.86% higher vis-a-vis that handled during previous fiscal. Kolkata Dock System, the first major dock formally commissioned in 1870, handled cargo traffic of 17.052 mt in 2022-23, registering a significant growth of 11.46% over the previous year. Haldia Dock Complex, the 1st green port of the country in 2015, handled 48.608 mt in 2022-23, recording growth of 11.8% over the last year. During 2022-23, 6,75,904 Container TEUs were handled at the Port vis-à-vis 7,35,195 TEUs during 2021-22. Total containerised tonnage handled at SMP, Kolkata was 10.59 million tonnes in 2022-23 vis-à-vis 11.8 million tonnes in 2021-22. Kolkata Dock System handled 5,68,722 TEUs in 2022-23 compared to 5,69,783 TEUs in 2021-22, recording a marginal decline. In 2019-20 Kolkata Dock System achieved the highest ever container throughput of 6,75,439 TEUs. Haldia Dock Complex handled 1,07,182 TEUs in 2022-23 vis-a-vis 1,65,412 TEUs in 2021-22.

Kolkata Port ranked 1st in terms of coking coal & other coal handling amongst major ports of India.

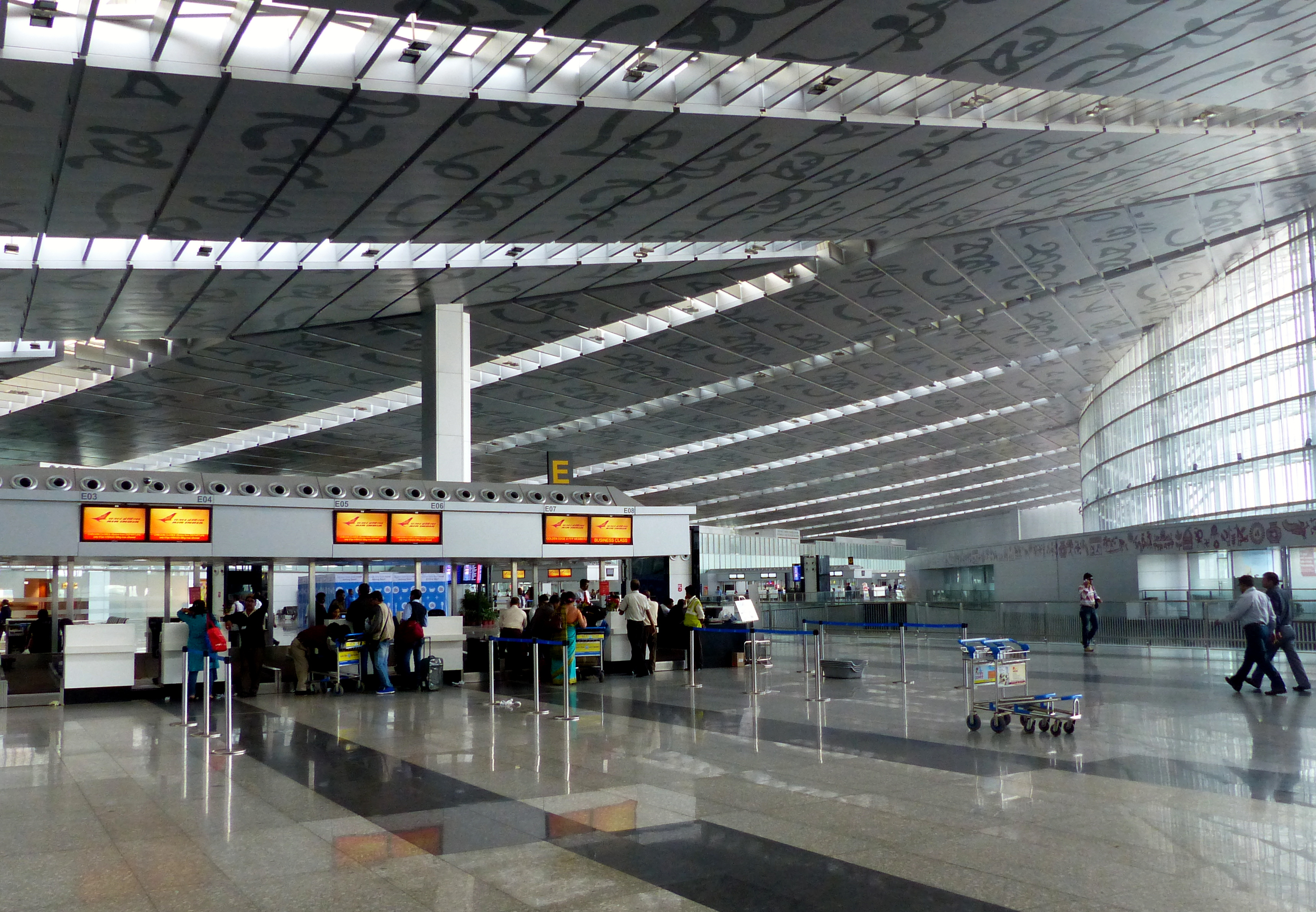
Inside Netaji Subhas Chandra Bose International Airport

=== Aviation ===
Spread over 2640 acres at Dum Dum in Kolkata, the largest in eastern India, the newly modernised Netaji Subhas Chandra Bose International Airport is the sixth busiest international airport in India in respect of aircraft movement (after Delhi, Mumbai, Bangalore, Hyderabad and Chennai). It has two asphalt runways, the primary one extended by 700 meters (3627 × 46m) and upgraded to CATIIIB, and the secondary one (3190 × 46m) upgraded to CATII ILS standards. Its terminal is a new and sprawling L-shaped six-level integrated terminal of over 2,510,000 sq ft inaugurated in 2013, able to handle 25 million passengers per annum. It includes check-in counters that use CUTE (Common User Terminal Equipment) technology, 78 immigration counters, 12 customs counters, passenger lounges provided by Air India and Jet Airways, 18 aerobridges, 57 remote parking bays, 2 underground two-leveled carparks and car parking facilities in landscaped area capable of handling 5000 cars. The airport has a Centre for Perishable Commodities (CPC), two luxury hotels and a shopping mall.

In the fiscal year April 2023 to March 2024, the airport handled 1,40,879 aircraft movements including 20,078 international aircraft movements, 19.784 million passengers (including 2.4 million international passengers and 17.31 million domestic passengers), 1,51,626 metric tonnes of freight.

== Salt Lake and New Town ==
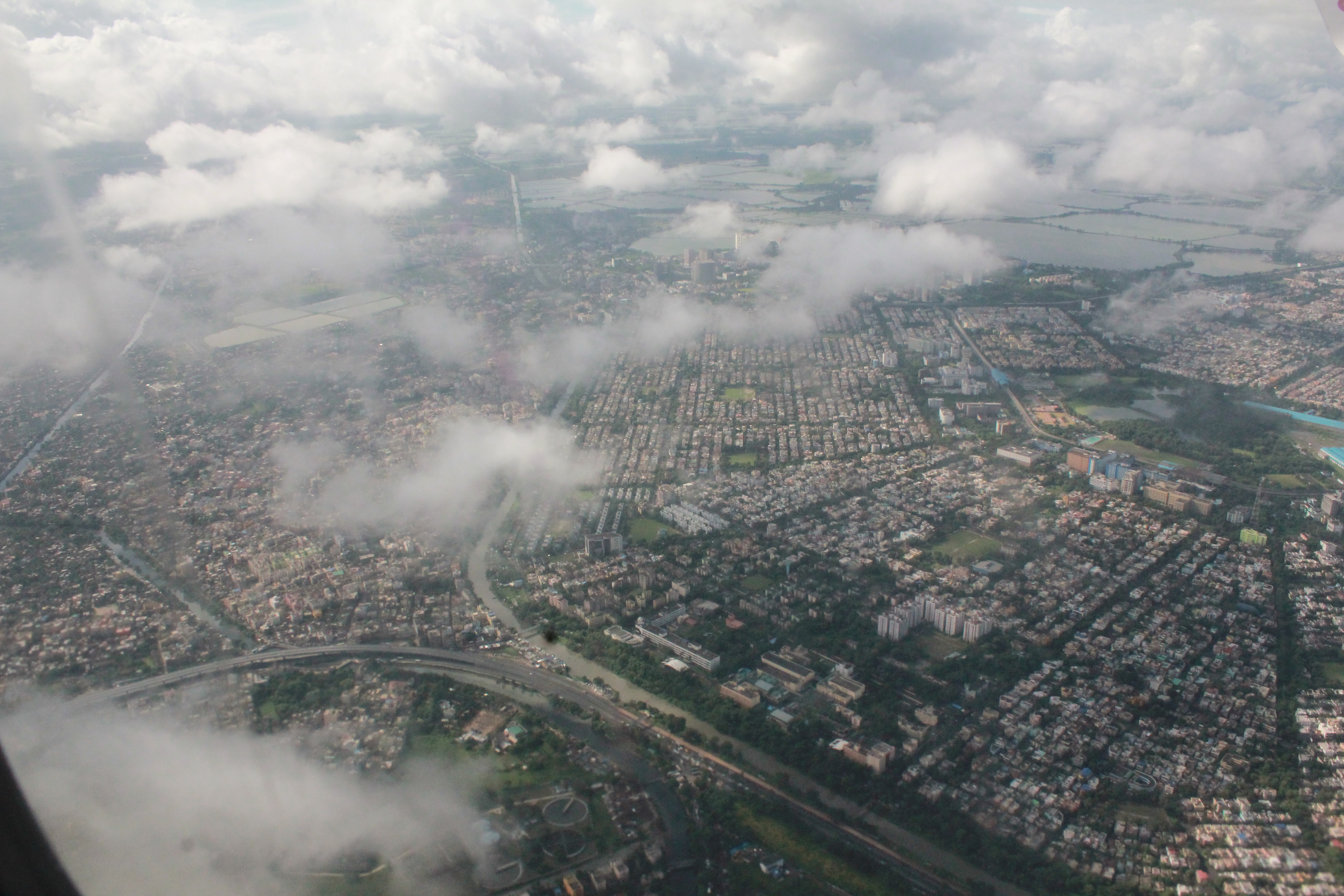
Aerial View of Salt Lake, Kolkata

Bidhannagar also known as Salt Lake City is a planned satellite city of Kolkata in North 24 Parganas district. As of April 2019, Sector V of Bidhannagar had approx 1,500 companies. Salt Lake Sector-V is the commercial sector of Bidhannagar city and a business district under Kolkata metropolitan area. Spread over an area of 430 Acres, Salt Lake Sector V is known as the IT Hub of Kolkata as well as East India.

As of 2023, there is 12.3 million sq. feet of grade A office space with 2.3 million sq. feet of grade A office space under development. Altogether Sector V have 14.6 million sq. feet of grade A office space which is highest in Kolkata Metropolitan Area. Most of the commercial spaces are eloped by IT/BPO companies.

New Town has emerged as the second IT hub of Kolkata after Salt Lake. Growing number of tech parks makes New Town a preferred destination for IT and ITes in East India. Several Information Technology majors are operational like Ericsson, Accenture, Capgemini, Tech Mahindra, ITC Infotech, Mindtree, Adani Labs, British Telecom, TCS, Wipro, Infosys, Cognizant etc. New Town also houses Bengal Silicon Valley Tech Hub.

Bengal Silicon Valley Tech Hub is an under construction technology hub in the Indian state of West Bengal, consisting of various tech parks, buildings, projects and premises which work on the sectors like IT/ITeS, data centre, E-commerce, IoT, KPO, AI, R&D and Telecom. The hub is projected to be completed in 2025, generating 1,00,000 direct jobs. As of 2022, the total investment in the hub is ₹1 lakh crore (US$10 billion). It is being built on an area of 250 acres.

FinTech Hub is a financial, commercial centre and business district located in New Town. The hub has the presence of a large number of banking, financial companies and legal institutions. Many major companies have their headquarters, offices and training centres operational or under construction. In 2010, inspired by the Bandra Kurla Complex in Mumbai and to turn Kolkata into an international financial centre, the then chief minister of West Bengal Buddhadeb Bhattacharjee and finance minister Asim Dasgupta proposed an International Financial Hub on 100 Acres of land in New Town. The union finance minister of that time, Pranab Mukherjee laid the foundation stone of the project on 13 October 2010. The project had a deadline to be completed in five years. In 2017, the project was relaunched as a FinTech hub. The purpose was to develop financial technology industry in West Bengal. In 2020, 23 financial institutions had their offices setup in the hub. First 10 acres were identified which was afterwards expanded. On 10 September 2021, HIDCO released an online portal for owing plots easily. Up to September 2021, 48 acres were allotted in 70 acres. As of 2022, 28 financial and legal institutions have their offices in fintech hub.

== Ease of doing business ==
The Kolkata Municipal Corporation (KMC) is the central authority which deals with the processing of new trade licenses and the renewal of the same as well. In 2019, Kolkata, along with Bengaluru was included in the list of cities in India for the World Bank's ease of doing business survey in India, which so far covered only New Delhi and Mumbai.

== Gallery ==
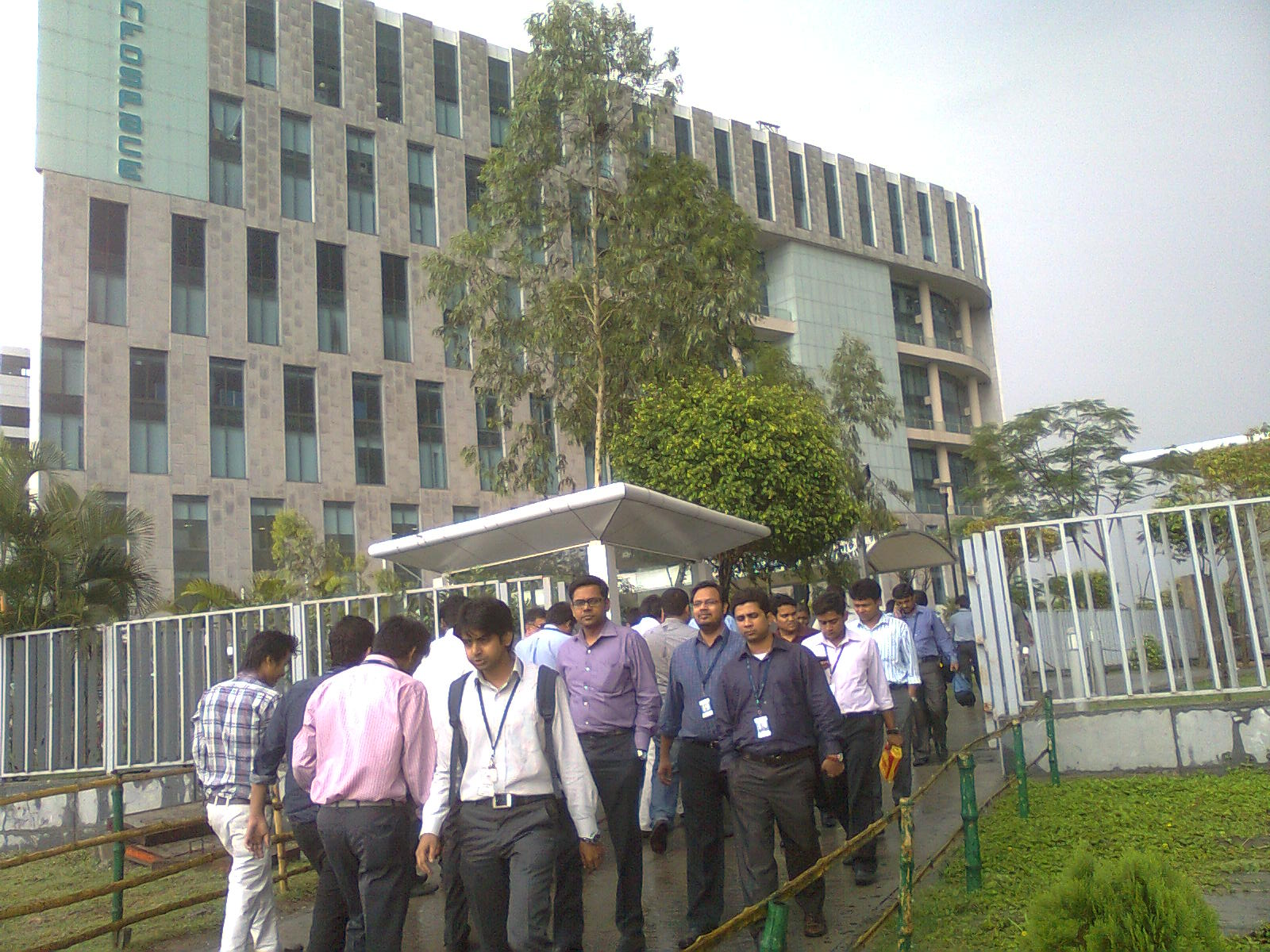
Unitech InfoSpace Hi-Tech Park (New Town) Kolkata

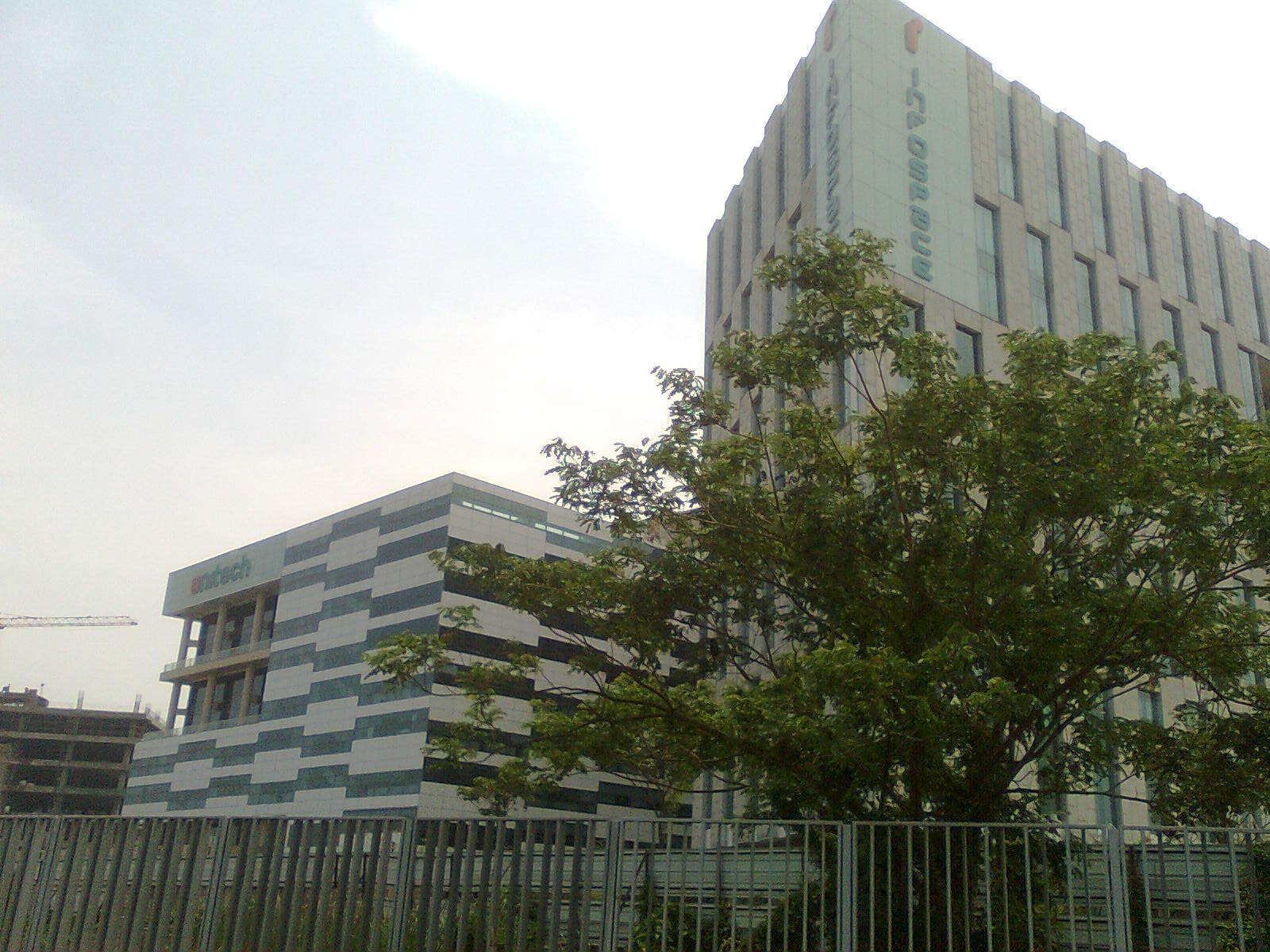
Unitech InfoSpace

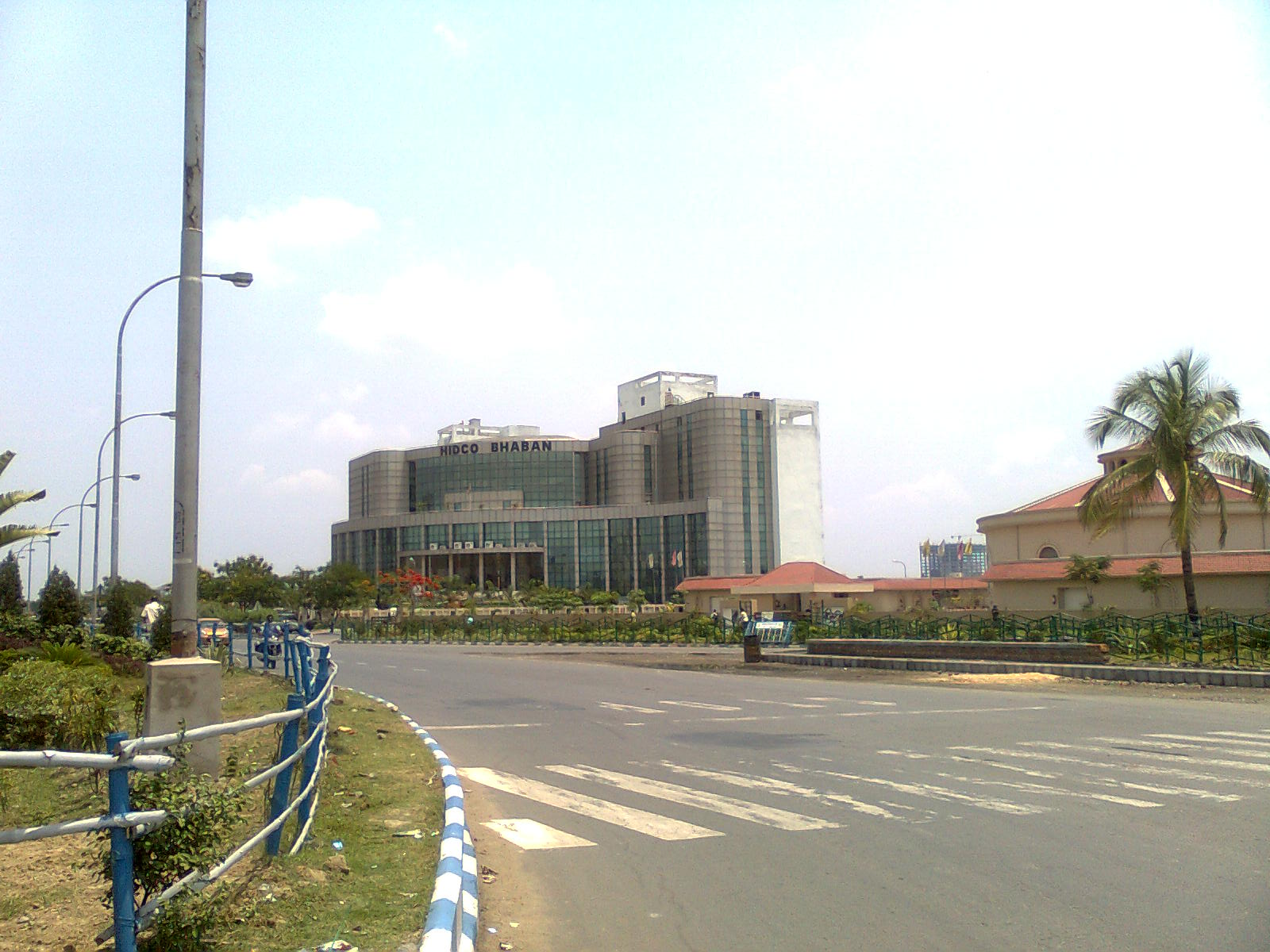
HIDCO Bhawan (Narkel Bagan) New Town Kolkata

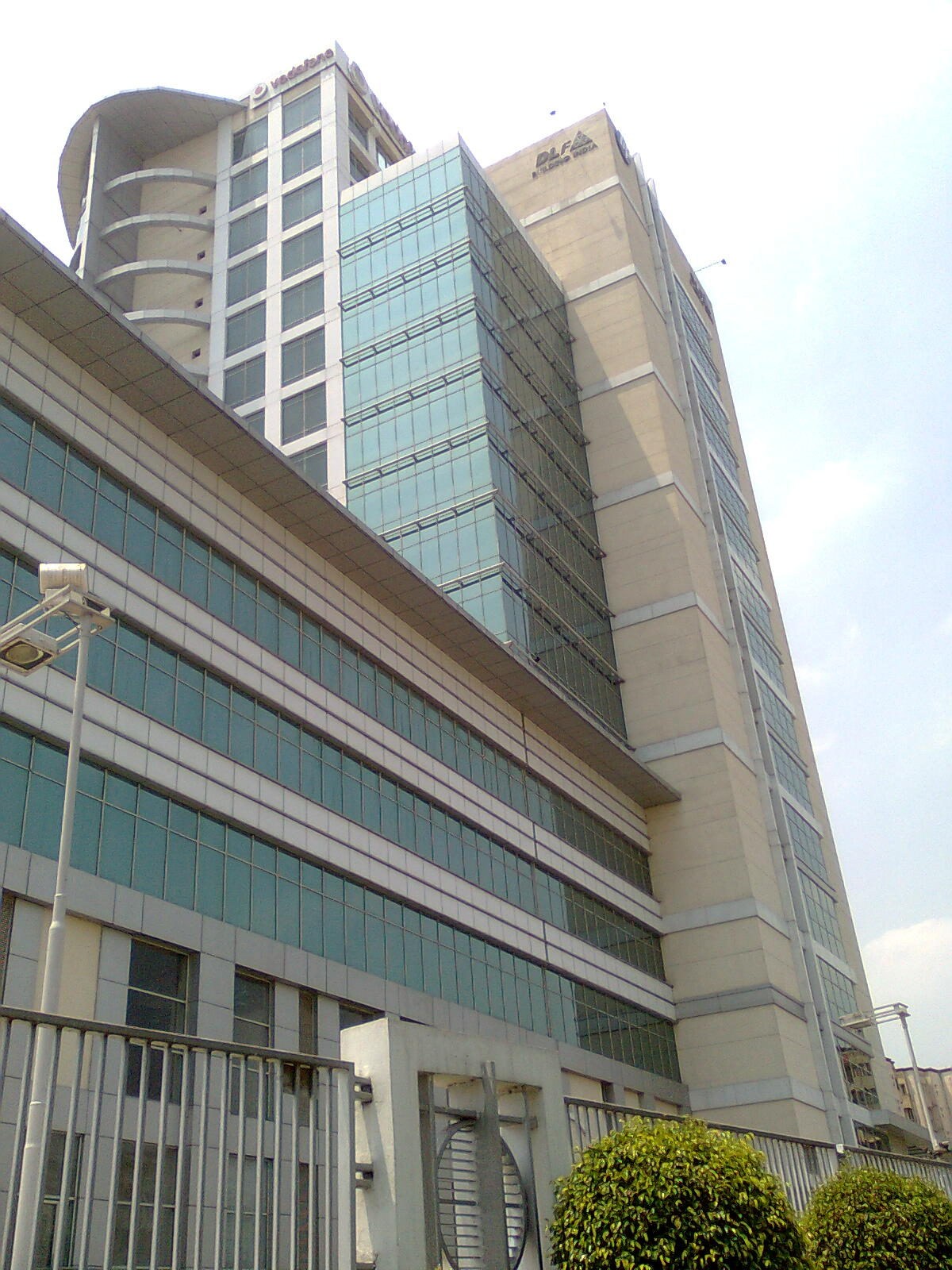
DLF (IBM Pvt. Ltd.) IT Tech Park, New Town, Kolkata

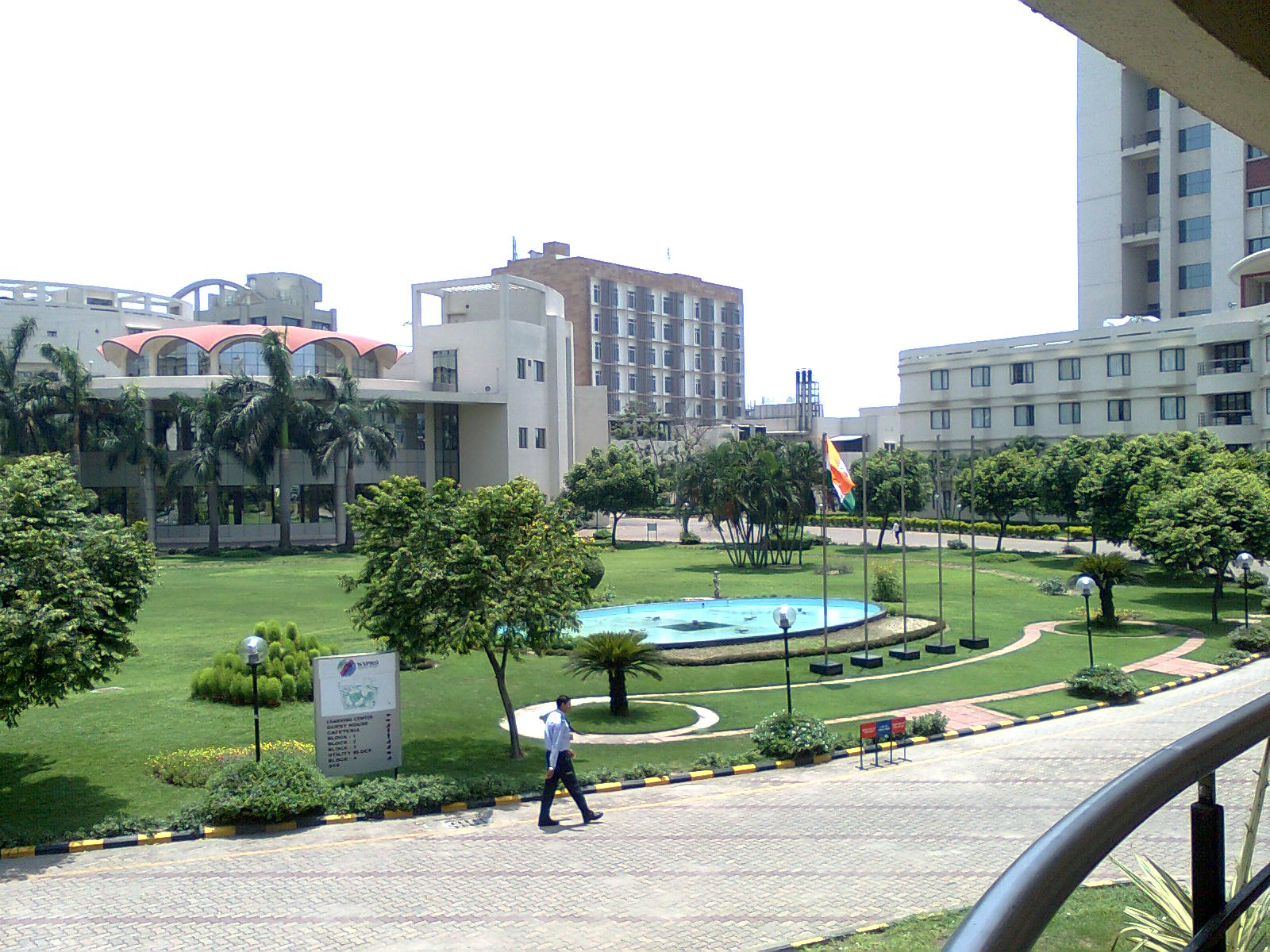
Inside Wipro Technologies Saltlake City, Sector V, Kolkata

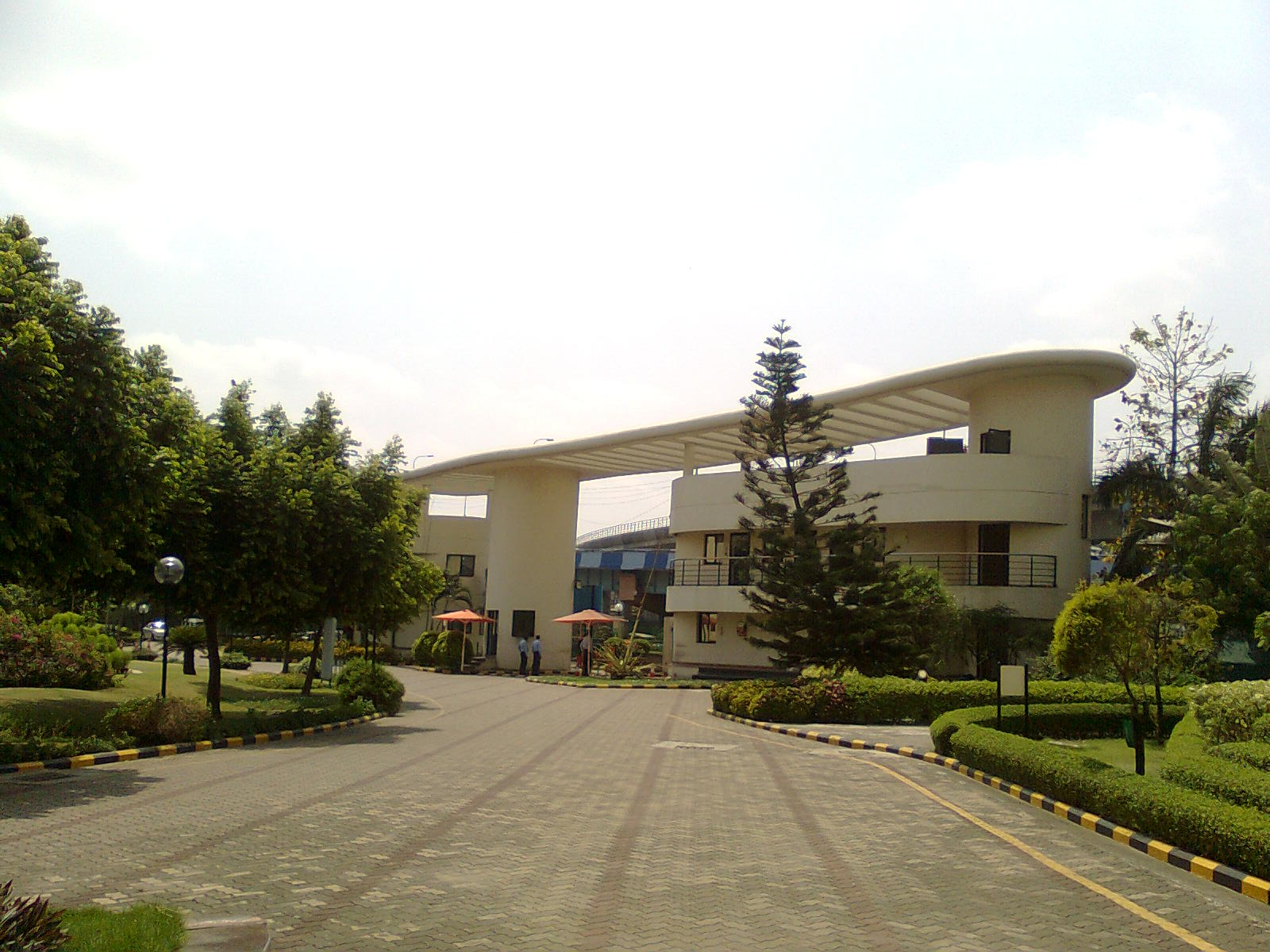
Wipro Technologies, Saltlake City, Sector V, Kolkata

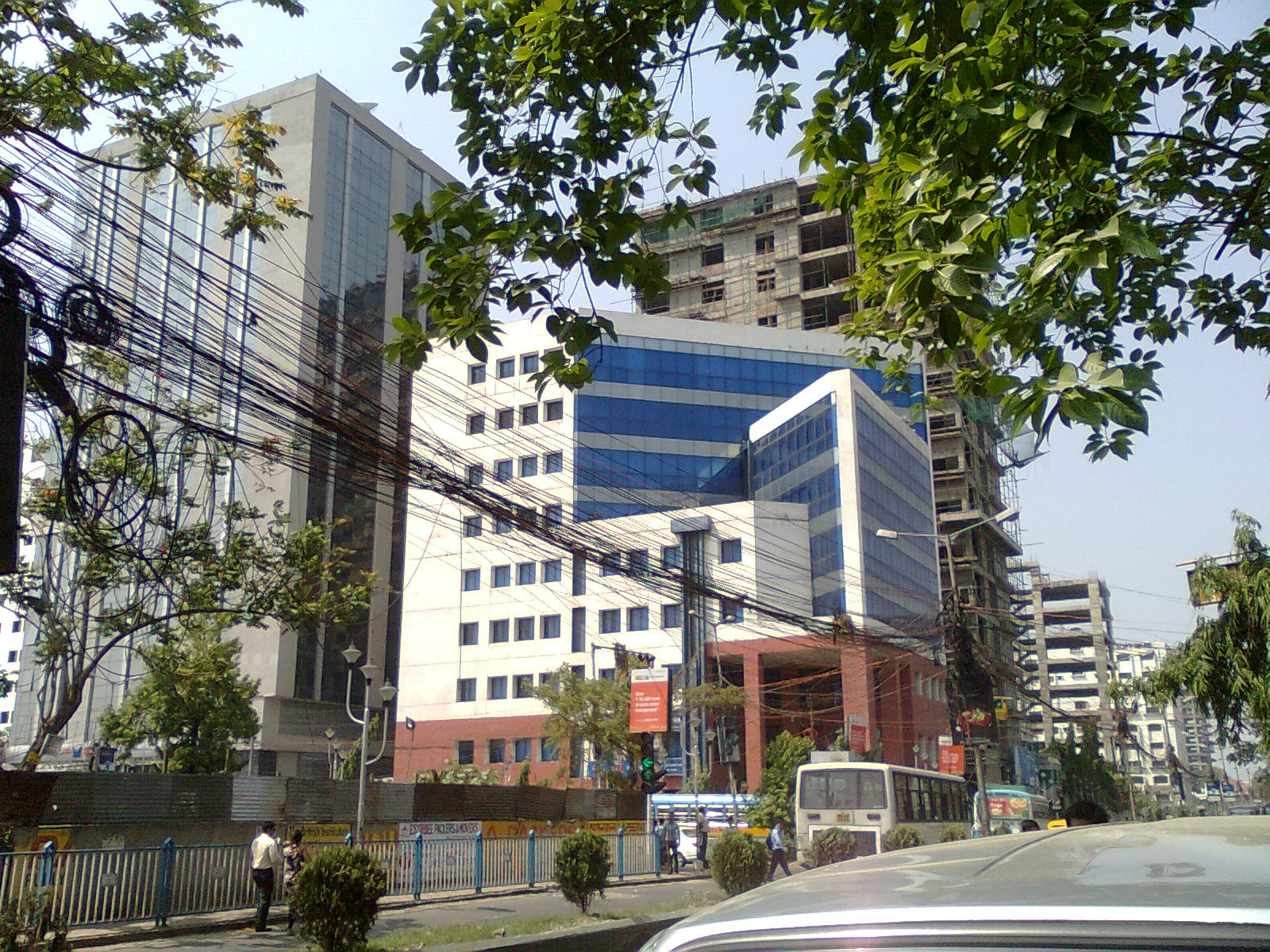
College More, Saltlake City, Sector V, Kolkata

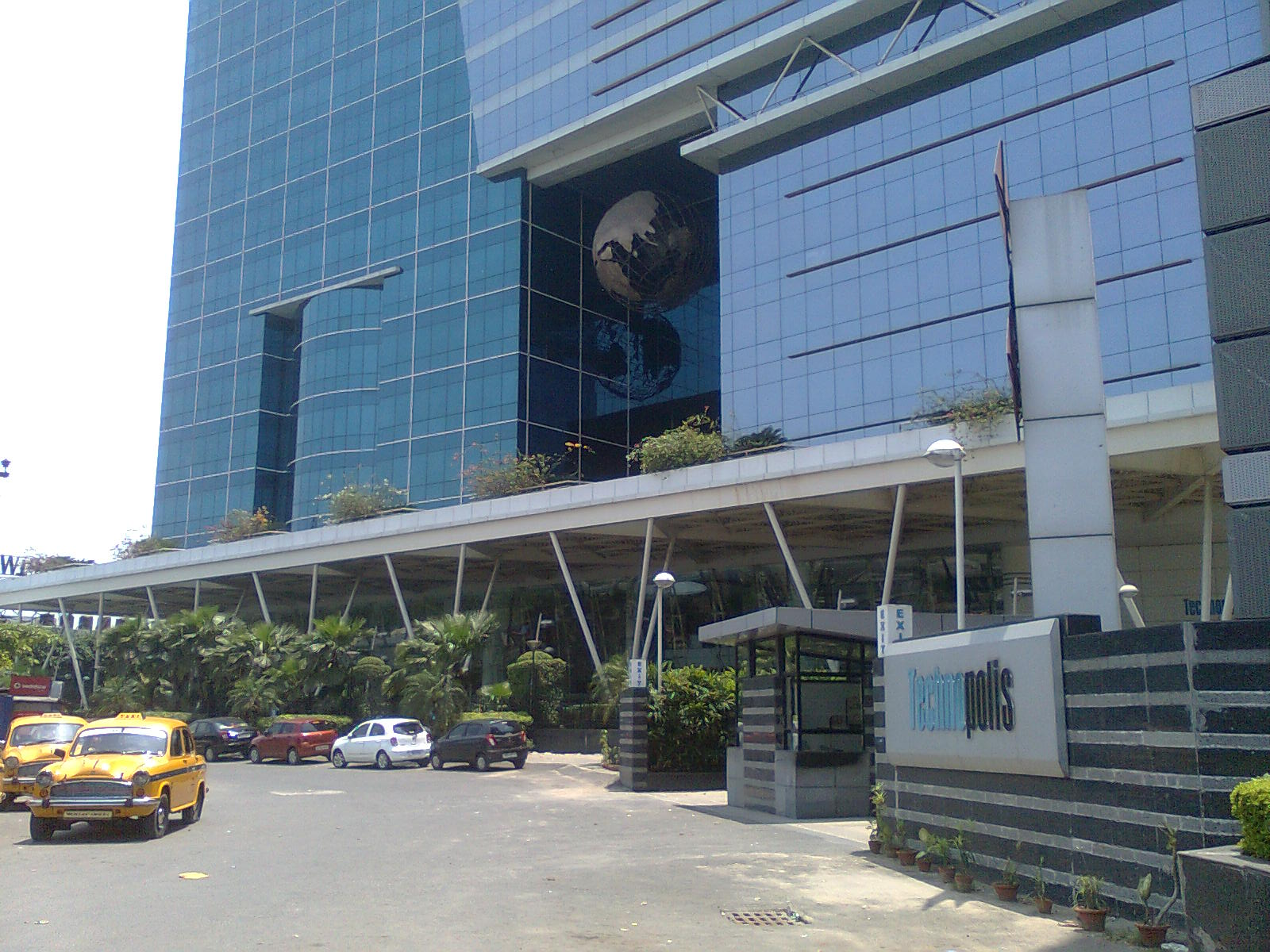
Technopolis, Saltlake City, Kolkata

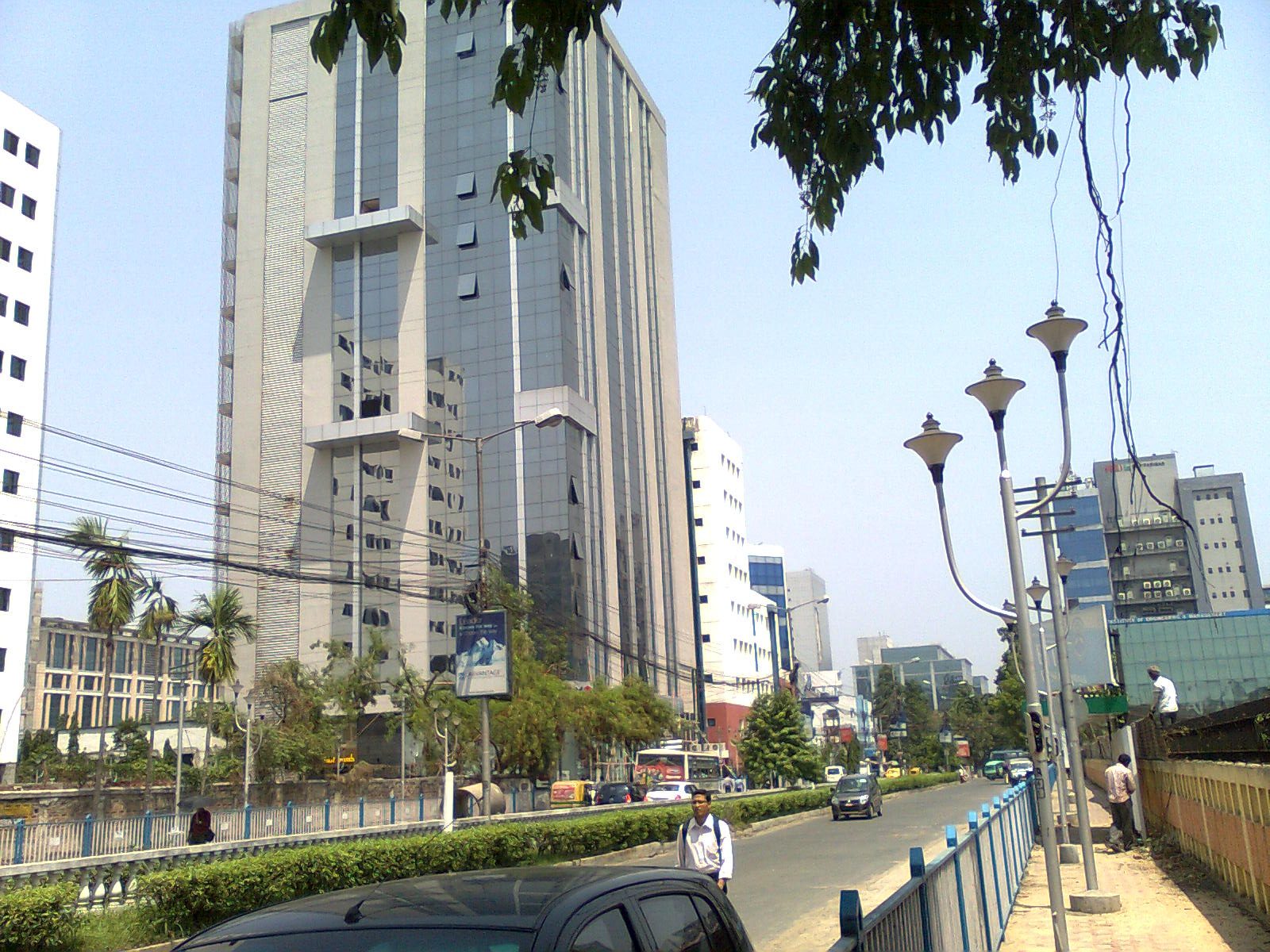
Saltlake City, Major Economy Towers

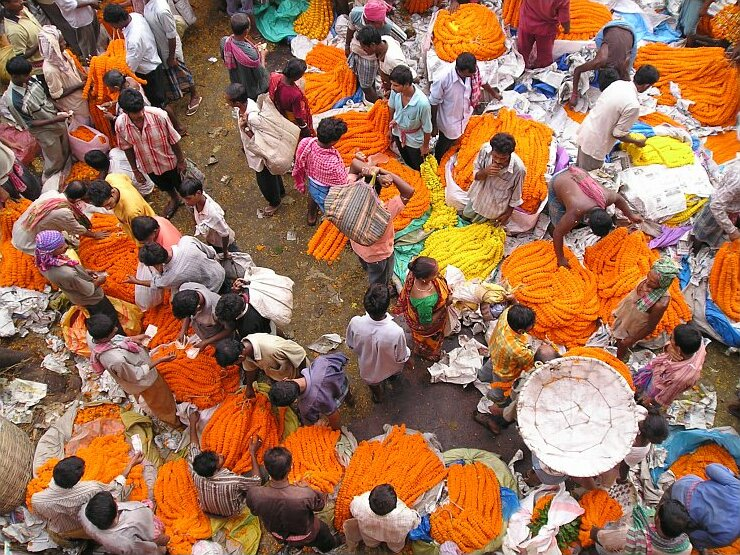
Mallikghat flower market

== See also ==
- Bengal Renaissance
- Calcutta Stock Exchange Association Limited
- HIDCO
- Kolkata Metro
