= Calcutta Tram Users Association =

Advocacy group

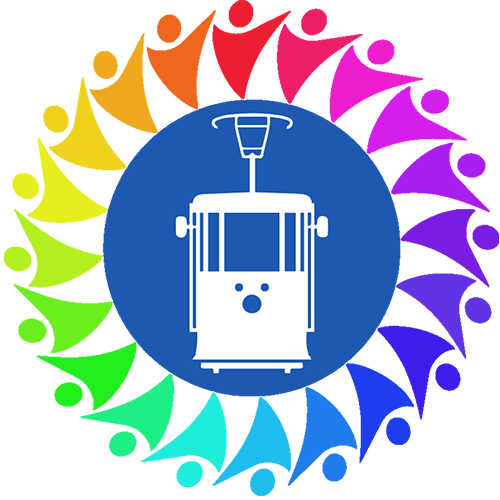
- Logo of Calcutta Tram Users Association
- Abbreviation: CTUA
- Formation: December 2016; 9 years ago
- Headquarters: Kolkata, India
- Location: Kolkata, India
- Region served: Kolkata
- President: Dr. Debasish Bhattacharyya
- General Secretary: Mahadeb Shi
- Joint Secretary: Sagnik Gupta
- Website: www.ctua.in

The Calcutta Tram Users Association (CTUA) is an apolitical advocacy group formed in December 2016 to defend and promote the use of Trams in Kolkata. The association was established during the 20th anniversary of the Kolkata–Melbourne Tramjatra festival, taking its name and inspiration from the Public Transport Users Association in Melbourne. A public meeting of tram enthusiasts was held at Esplanade.

== Allegations of anti-tram campaigns ==
Trams in Kolkata are currently operated by the West Bengal Transport Corporation through the Calcutta Tramways Company. Members of the CTUA allege that the gradual decline of Kolkata trams, beginning in 2011, is the result of an anti-tram propaganda campaign purportedly run by the government and supported by automobile and auto-rickshaw lobbies. Since 2011, most Kolkata tramlines have been progressively closed. Members of the CTUA have further alleged that the Government of West Bengal colluded with the Kolkata Traffic Police and the Kolkata Municipal Corporation to suppress tram operations.

== Foundation of CTUA ==
The CTUA, under the leadership of its president, Dr Debasish Bhattacharyya, a retired scientist, has been advocating for the preservation and revival of trams in Kolkata. Registered as an independent society, the association emerged as a collective of individuals united in their opposition to the removal of trams from the city.

== Legal advocacy ==
As a registered society, the CTUA is eligible to seek legal assistance and pursue legal remedies. The association has been involved in legal advocacy relating to the preservation and modernisation of tram services in Kolkata, including proceedings in which the High Court directed the state to consider restoring and upgrading the tram network.

== Public awareness programme ==
The CTUA advocates for the preservation of the city's tram system not only through legal efforts but also by promoting public awareness about trams. The association conducts press meetings, academic seminars, and public events to highlight the significance of trams in Kolkata.

== Social events ==
- The 150th anniversary of the Kolkata tram system was celebrated with a special tram parade. As part of the event, a tramcar that had originally been used in the 1920s to supply water and clean the tracks was rolled out once again for a day. Later that month, two wooden-bodied trams manufactured in the previous two decades—but lying idle in depots—were also seen running on the streets of the city. The parade additionally featured double-bogey and air-conditioned trams that remain in service. These trams have survived World War II and witnessed major historical events, including the Bengal famine, communal riots, and the independence movement, and have now become historical artefacts in their own right. A week-long celebration of Calcutta Tramways' legacy was held from 24 February 2023 to 2 March 2023.
- The 151st anniversary of Kolkata trams was observed from 20 to 24 February 2024 through a series of cultural events. The commemoration concluded with a street-corner meeting at the Esplanade tram terminus, which included public demonstrations against recent government policies perceived as aimed at phasing out this pollution-free, low-maintenance mode of public transport. Speaking at the meeting, CTUA president Dr Debasish Bhattacharyya stated: "We had a meeting on 13 February when we decided that to celebrate the 151st birthday of the Kolkata tram, we will gather at the Gariahat depot at 10 a.m. on 24 February. Notable people and dignitaries will be invited. It will be more of a cultural event than a direct protest, where we will voice our demands through the dignitaries. We will also organise a special tram ride to the Esplanade depot and back. On 15 March afternoon, a street-corner meeting will be held at the Esplanade. This will be a pure protest gathering in association with other organisations."
- After reports emerged suggesting that the Government of West Bengal, the owner and current operating authority of Kolkata trams, intended to shut down the 151-year-old tramway—except for preserving a single route for tourism—and given that the government did not deny these reports, concerns intensified that the iconic Kolkata tramway may soon disappear from the city and from India. On 25 July 2024, the CTUA held a press conference as part of its renewed efforts to oppose the potential closure. At the conference, CTUA president Dr Debasish Bhattacharyya stated: "The transport department has completely ignored the guidelines issued by the high court in its order for 'restoration, maintenance, and preservation' of the tramways. The reasons forwarded by the department against tramways are completely imaginary, such as trams slowing down traffic. The sale of tram depot lands will be a disaster because, once sold, you won't get back the land. Moreover, heritage of the city is not confined to the Maidan (when the lone route might be preserved for tourism). The Kolkata tramway is a living industrial heritage eligible for UNESCO tag." At the same event, G. M. Kapur, CEO of the INTACH Kolkata Chapter, added: "There are cities in Europe, Asia, the Americas, Australia, Africa—in fact all over the world—where electric trams are either being modernised or being reintroduced, while shockingly, we in Kolkata are doing away with them. What can be the logic behind such a move is not understandable."

== Collaborations ==
- On World Environment Day, 5 June 2024, while much of India was following the results of the general elections, around 70 tram enthusiasts from the CTUA and the SwitchOn Foundation gathered in Kolkata to call for the restoration of what they described as the most environment-friendly mode of urban transport.
- On 25 July 2024, the CTUA, in association with the INTACH (Kolkata Chapter), organised a press conference and public awareness programme criticising government policies that were perceived as attempts to phase out trams from the streets of Kolkata.
