= Kamalgazi =

- Neighbourhood
- Location in West Bengal Location in India
- Coordinates: 22.4495°N 88.3955°E
- Country: India
- State: West Bengal
- Division: Presidency
- District: South 24 Parganas
- City: Kolkata
- Region: Greater Kolkata

Government
  - Type: Municipality
  - Body: Rajpur Sonarpur Municipality
- Elevation: 9 m (30 ft)

Languages
  - Official: Bengali
  - Additional official: English
- Time zone: UTC+5:30 (IST)
- PIN: 700103
- Telephone code: +91 33
- Vehicle registration: WB-19 to WB-22, WB-95 to WB-99
- Lok Sabha constituency: Jadavpur
- Vidhan Sabha constituency: Sonarpur Uttar
- Website: www.rajpursonarpurmunicipality.in

Kamalgazi is a locality of Rajpur Sonarpur in South 24 Parganas district in the Indian state of West Bengal. It is a part of the area covered by the Kolkata Metropolitan Development Authority (KMDA).

== Geography ==
Cities and towns in the northern part of Baruipur subdivision (including Sonarpur, Bhangar I & II CD blocks) in South 24 Parganas district
M: municipal city/ town, CT: census town, R: rural/ urban centre, N: neighbourhood
Owing to space constraints in the small map, the actual locations in a larger map may vary slightly

=== Area overview ===
Baruipur subdivision is a rural subdivision with moderate levels of urbanization. 31.05% of the population lives in the urban areas and 68.95% lives in the rural areas. In the northern portion of the subdivision (shown in the map alongside) there are 10 census towns. The entire district is situated in the Ganges Delta and the northern part of the subdivision is a flat plain bordering the metropolis of Kolkata.

Note: The map alongside presents some of the notable locations in the subdivision. All places marked in the map are linked in the larger full screen map.

=== Location ===
Kamalgazi is located at 22°26′58″N 88°23′44″E. It has an average elevation of 9 metres (30 ft).

== Transport ==
Kamalgazi is on the State Highway 1.

Narendrapur railway station is located nearby.

== Education ==
Kamalgazi F P Primary School is a Bengali-medium coeducational school. It was established in 1940 and has facilities for teaching from class I–IV.

== Healthcare ==
Sonarpur Rural Hospital, with 25 beds, at Rajpur Sonarpur, is the major government medical facility in the Sonarpur CD block.
