= Briji =

- Neighbourhood in Kolkata (Calcutta)
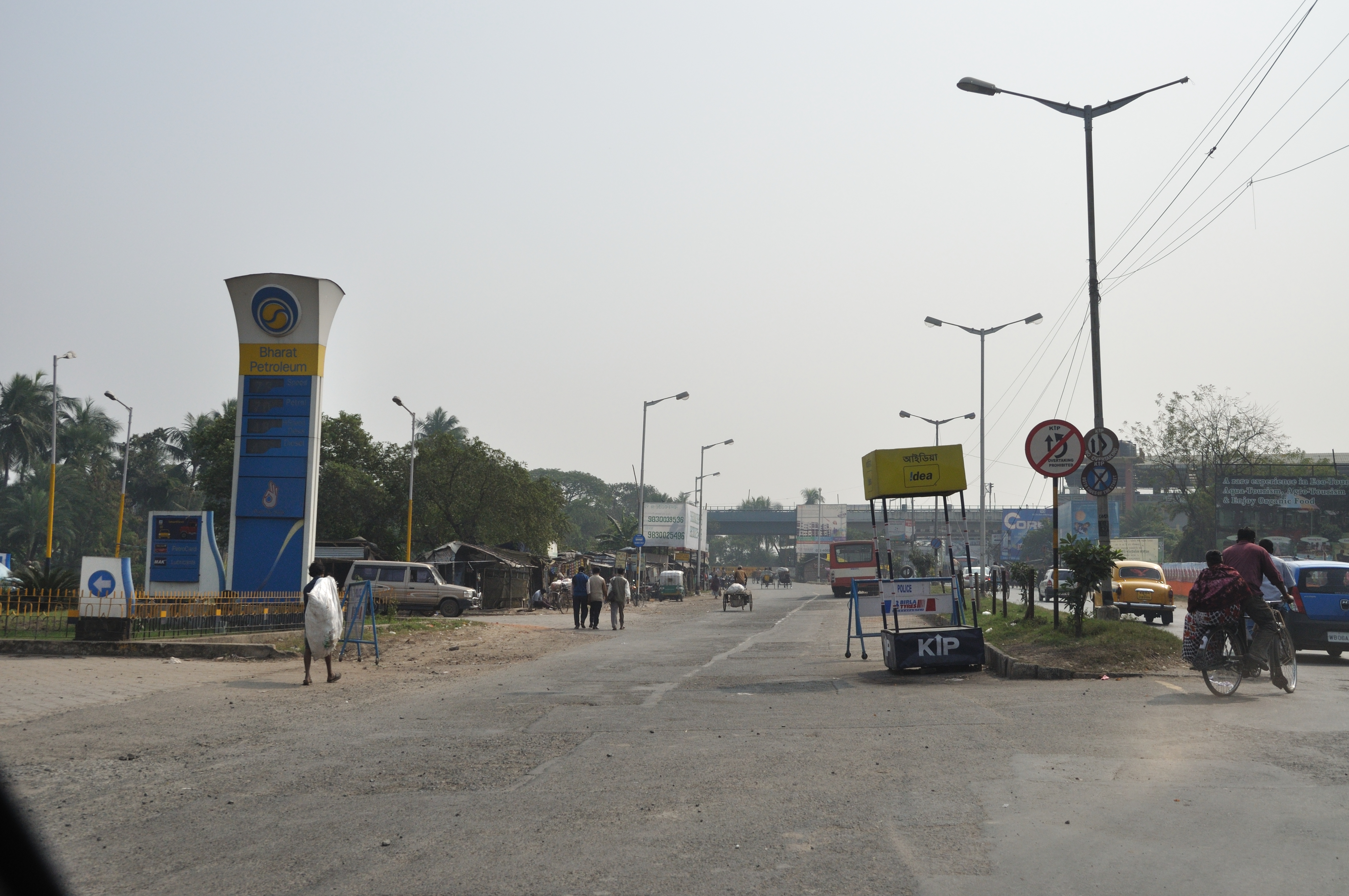

- Location in Kolkata Briji (West Bengal) Briji (India)
- Coordinates: 22.4666°N 88.3877°E
- Country: India
- State: West Bengal
- City: Kolkata
- District: Kolkata
- Metro Station: Shahid Khudiram
- KMC wards: 110

Government
  - Type: Municipal Corporation
  - Body: Kolkata Municipal Corporation

Languages
  - Official: Bengali, English
- Time zone: UTC+5:30 (IST)
- PIN: 700084
- Telephone code: +91 33
- Lok Sabha constituency: Jadavpur
- Vidhan Sabha constituency: Jadavpur

Briji is a locality of South Kolkata in West Bengal, India. It is a part of Garia.
