= Department of Transport (West Bengal) =

Bengal government ministry

Department overview
- Jurisdiction: Government of West Bengal
- Headquarters: Paribahan Bhawan, Kolkata
- Minister responsible: Arjun Singh, Cabinet Minister
- Deputy Minister responsible: Anandamoy Barman, MoS
- Website: http://transport.wb.gov.in/

The Department of Transport of West Bengal is a department of the Government of West Bengal.

It is responsible for the provision of transport facilities and infrastructure on road, inland water and air – within the domain of West Bengal. It also provides administrative and legal framework for the same. Its activities span issuing of licences and permits, registration of vehicles, issuance of permits, operation of public transport services, development of transport infrastructure and promotion of private sector investment in the sector.

State Transport Undertakings provide transport facilities in the state. The West Bengal Transport Corporation (WBTC) renders transport services within the capital city of Kolkata and its suburban areas. The South Bengal State Transport Corporation (SBSTC) looks after transport services in the districts of South and South-Western Bengal while transport facilities in the districts of North Bengal are primarily dependent on North Bengal State Transport Corporation (NBSTC).

== Headquarters ==
The department operates from Paribahan Bhawan, which was the building earlier housing the headquarters of West Bengal Transport Corporation (formerly Calcutta Tramways Company). It oversees the Public Vehicles Department, in essence the Regional Transport Office (RTO) for the city. In addition to that, there are RTOs in each of the districts which are usually located at the District Magistrate (India)'s office precincts.

Within the department is its functional & executive arm called the Transport Directorate. It operates out of Paribahan Bhavan-2 (First Floor) at Kasba, near Ruby Junction on the EM Bypass since 2 November 2016.

The department team is headed by the Cabinet Minister for Transport, who may or may not be supported by Ministers of State. Civil servants are assigned to them to manage the ministers' office and ministry. The current head of the ministry is Arjun Singh, since 10 June 2026.
