= Rathtala =

Locality in Balurghat, West Bengal

Rathtala is a neighbourhood in Balurghat, Dakshin Dinajpur, West Bengal, India. It falls under the jurisdiction of Ward No. 18 of Balurghat Municipality.
