= West Bengal Transport Corporation =

Public transport operator in Kolkata, India

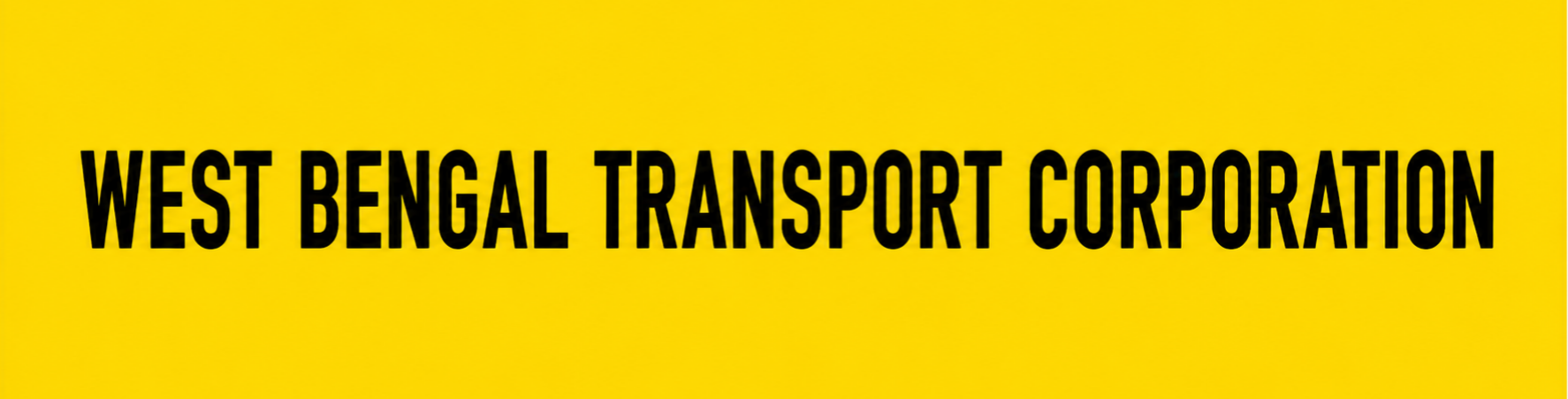
- Type: Public transport
- Predecessor: STS (1948–1960); CSTC (1960–2017); CTC (1880–2017); WBSTC (1991–2017)
- Founded: 8 June 2016
- Headquarters: Paribahan Bhavan – I, 12, R.N. Mukherjee Road, Kolkata, West Bengal 700001, India
- Area served: Kolkata; West Bengal
- Services: Bus Service; Tram Service; Ferry Service
- Owner: Ministry of Transport, Government of West Bengal
- Website: wbtconline.in

West Bengal Transport Corporation (WBTC) is a West Bengal state government undertaken corporation which plies buses, trams and ferries in the state. It was formed by merging existing state transport agencies, namely the Calcutta State Transport Corporation (CSTC), the Calcutta Tramways Company (CTC) and the West Bengal Surface Transport Corporation (WBSTC).

== History ==
Bus services in Kolkata (then known as Calcutta) started in the year 1920 but were unorganised. The organized road transport in the public sector was given shape on 31 July 1948 with the creation of State Transport Services under the Directorate of Transportation, Government of West Bengal. It started operations on 6 intracity routes, with a fleet of 25 buses. The diesel era started with the addition of two double-decker buses in 1949–50. Then the STS became self-sustainable with the establishment of depots and terminals. Gradually, the structure of State Transport Services turned into a full-fledged organization with spreading its network of operation to the entire city (mainly covering Calcutta Improvement Trust area). After about 12 years, State Transport Services became CSTC (Calcutta State Transport Corporation) on 15 June 1960. This was the start of a new era for the public transport system in the city and state. Up to 1966–67, CSTC nationalized about 90% of the city's routes. After that CSTC could not sustain the increased passenger demands in the city mainly due to financial constraints. Since then the Government decided to allow private buses to operate on CSTC routes and areas. It also started operating on long-distance routes, starting with Calcutta–Digha in 1968. Over the years, with rapid expansions of long-distance operations, CSTC connected remote rural areas of the state with Kolkata. Soon, it covered almost the whole state and connected the district headquarter towns. In 1989, a new body was formed, named West Bengal Inland Water Transport Corporation Limited, for the operation of vessel services. It started with ferry services on the Hooghly River and the Muri Ganga rivers. Later this was merged into West Bengal Surface Transport Corporation, which provided bus services in Kolkata and different areas of South 24-Parganas, along with the CSTC. In June 2016, WBSTC, CTC and CSTC were merged into one with operational name WBTC. Till the merger, WBSTC had a fleet of 233 (Volvo AC, TATA Marco Polo AC and non-AC) buses.

== Operations ==
=== Fleet ===
WBTC has a fleet of 1337 buses as of 2019. and 20 vessels for Passenger Ferry Service. Right now its fleet consists of 400 AC buses. These were brought under the visionary of the central JNNURM scheme. The buses are in blue and white livery of Volvo, Tata Marcopolo, Eicher and JanBus models from Ashok Leyland, the first low floor front entry public buses in the country.

=== Division ===
Previously, the depots were separately administered by CSTC, CTC, WBSTC. But after the merger, all have come under the purview of WBTC.

=== Depots ===
WBTC Depots are used for parking and repairing buses and trams. The following depots are:

Nilgunge Depot (ND)
Belghoria Depot (BD)
Garia Depot (GD)
Howrah Depot (HD)
Kasba Depot (KD)
Lake Depot (LD)
Maniktala Depot (MD)
Paikpara Depot (PD)
Salt Lake Depot (SLD)
Taratala Depot (TD)
Thakurpukur Depot (TPD)
Belgachia Depot (BL)
Tollygunge Depot (TG)
Khidirpur Depot (KP)
Gariahat Depot (GH)
Park Circus Depot (PC)
Pride Plaza Depot (PRD)
Rajabazar Depot (RB)
Nonapukur Depot (NP)
Ultadanga Depot (UD)
Joka Depot (JK)
Kalighat Depot (KG)
Barasat Depot (BS)
Ghasbagan Depot (GB)
Habra Depot (HB)

== Services ==
=== Bus services ===
Buses are operated on many routes across Kolkata and its suburban areas providing express bus service with limited stops.

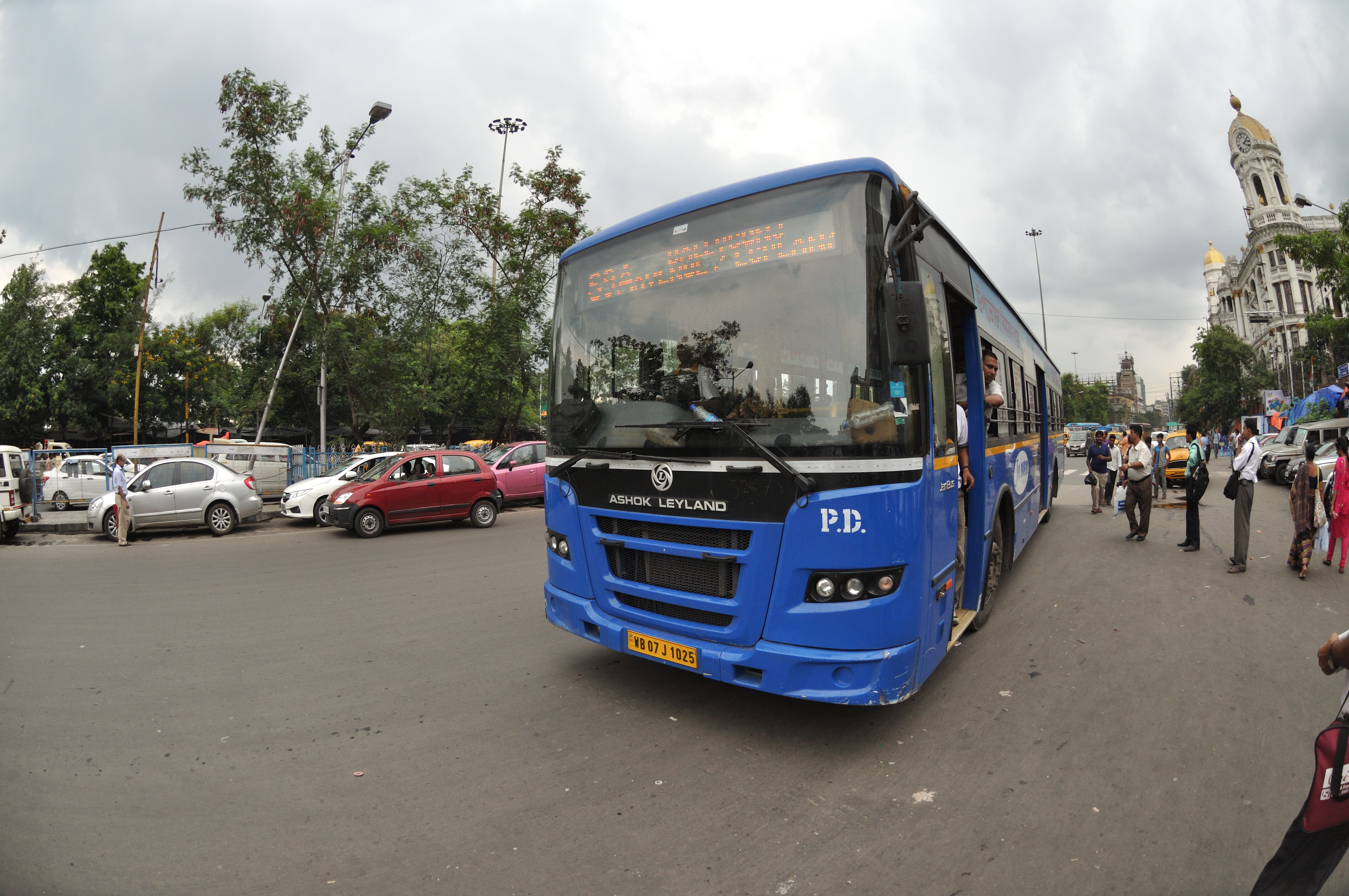

=== Late night services ===
This was introduced to provide late night transportation service to the city. Buses ply on several important routes across the city connecting northern & southern parts of the city with Howrah Station, Kolkata Airport, Salt Lake and New Town. These routes are AC-39, AC-24/AC-24A, AC-12D, AC-5, AC-47, AC-50A, S-10A, E-1, E-32, AC-54, EB-14, S-22, S-24, S-7, S-12, S-12D, S-3A, S-30, S-31 and AC-37.

=== Banglashree Express AC Bus services ===
This service was introduced to connect district Headquarters towns of the state with the state capital with express bus service, so that people can travel overnight to reach Kolkata.

The bus route number starts with BE.

=== Tram services ===
The tram operations came under WBTC from CTC, after the merge. In 2019 air-conditioned Trams were introduced in the network.

=== Ferry services ===
WBTC also operates ferry routes across Hooghly river. One can avail the services using daily tickets, and few routes using season ticket.

=== Special Bus services ===
Some special bus services are also provided on some occasions like

- Gangasagar Mela
- Durga Puja Parikrama
- Durga Puja Shopping
- International Kolkata Book Fair
- Winter Weekend Special
- Eco Park Operation
- Christmas Carnival
- Haj Pilgrims

== Public initiatives ==
- Kolkata Tram Library: WBTC launched India's first Tram library on 24 September 2020, in presence of MD, WBTC, Rajanvir Singh Kapur IAS
- Kolkata Heritage River Cruise: launched by WBTC on 1 October 2020.
- Kolkata Tyre Park: launched on 13 November 2020, made using scrap tyres in presence of Chairman Rachpal Singh, Vice Chairman Saha and MD Rajanvir Singh Kapur IAS.
- Paat Rani: A tram with jute items made by inmates of Presidency and Dum Dum Correctional Homes was launched on 13 November 2020.
- On 14 November 2020, WBTC launched world's first children library named Kolkata Young Readers’ Tramcar. Launched by MD WBTC Rajanvir Singh Kapur and Director Apeejay.
- Road Safety Campaign called 'Safe Drive Save Life'.
- Environment Protection campaign through the Green Movement campaign
- On the 140th Anniversary of registration of the Calcutta Tramways Company in London, on 22 December 2020; WBTC launched Tram World Kolkata (TWK). TWK was planned to convert a junkyard in Gariahat Tram depot. The entire effort took 41 days.

In 41 days the area was converted into a paradise for tram lovers, with stamps, tickets, coins, old tram documents and vintage photos. Food, music and art will be added in due course to make it an international tourist destination for tram lovers.

Launched by MD Rajanvir Singh Kapur IAS in presence of Chairman Rachpal Singh IPS Retd.

== Other utilities ==
=== Intelligent Transport System ===
To cope up with the increasing demand of public transport in the city, some innovative measures were taken up, with a cost of ₹ 9,39,89,926, except fleet management. This also includes the Yatri Sathi app.

- On-Bus Intelligent Transport System (OBITS)
- Automatic Fare collection system (AFCS) with Smart Card ticketing system (West Bengal Transport Card)
- Passenger Information system including Mobile Application on the basis of Vehicle Tracking System
- Fleet Management System
- Integration Services for UBS-II complied Buses
- Passenger friendly on-board destination display
- Removal of additional switch for ITS to enable tracking whenever the ignition is on
- Zero cost on commuter to use these facilities – info available on their smart phones and publicly displayed LEDs
- A unique application (Driver's app) has been introduced to track non-BS-IV vehicles too

== See also ==
- Transport in Kolkata
- Trams in Kolkata
- Calcutta State Transport Corporation
- Calcutta Tramways Company
