= Choto Rasbari =

Temple complex in Kolkata, India

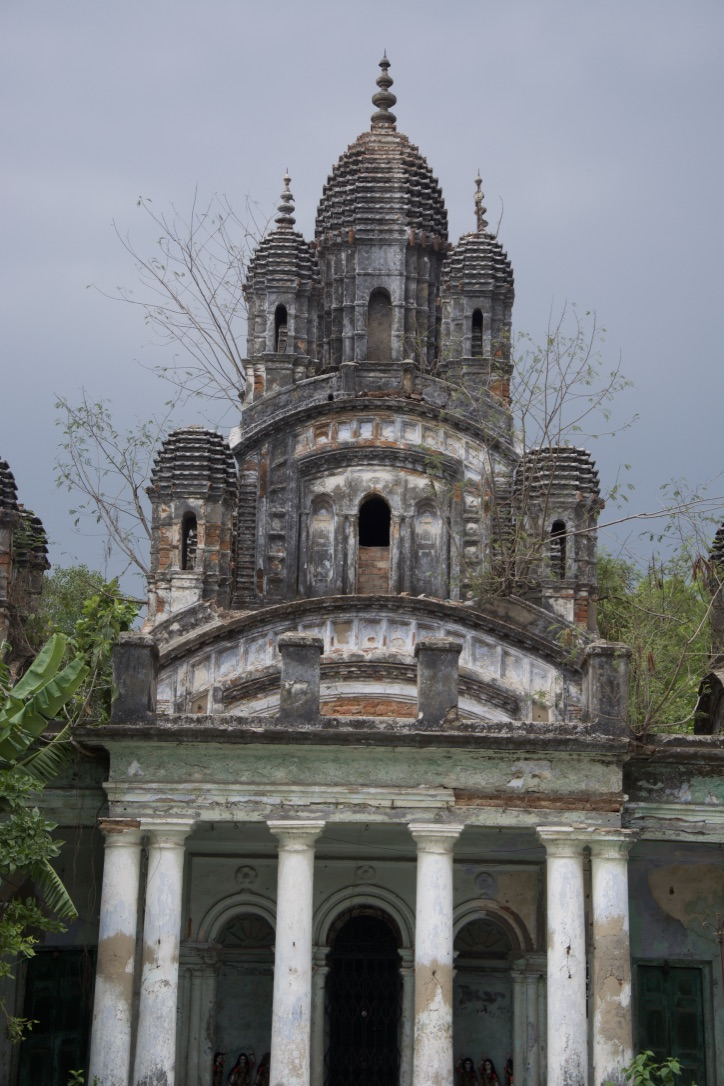
- Choto Rasbari, Chetla

Religion
- Affiliation: Hinduism
- District: Kolkata district
- Deity: Shyam Sundar Jiu

Location
- Location: Chetla
- State: West Bengal
- Country: India

Architecture
- Type: Bengal architecture
- Style: Naba-ratna
- Founder: Bawali Raj family
- Completed: 1847; 179 years ago
- Temples: 1 main temple of Shyam Sundar Jiu and temples dedicated to other deities

Choto Rashbari or Harihar Dham of 93, Tollygunge Road, Kolkata - 33 is a Grade-I heritage building under Kolkata Municipal Corporation.

== History ==
The temples were founded by Pyarilal Mondal and Monimohan Mondal, members of the Bawali Raj family. The construction started on 27th Phalgun, 1252 and it took almost a year to complete. The temples were officially inaugurated on 31st Chaitra, 1253 as per the Bengali calendar and when converted to Gregorian, it comes to April 1847. The temple complex are by the side of Adi Ganga, which one time served as a major pilgrim route and there is also a ghat named as Choto Rashbari Ghat with four columns; but alas now in pathetic state and the plasters have peeled. There was also a nahabatkhana. Earlier there happened to be a room on either side of the ghat but now a wall has been put up thereby preventing access. A flight of stairs will lead one to the river. The condition of Adi Ganga is also the same as that of the ghat - the river bed is shallow. There are two plaques on either side of the main entrance to the temple. The plaque on the left hand side written in payar chanda, i.e., one type of rhythm stating the mandatory do's that the visitors to the temple must obey - footwear must be left outside and there is strict no-no for entering the temple on horseback, elephant and palanquin.

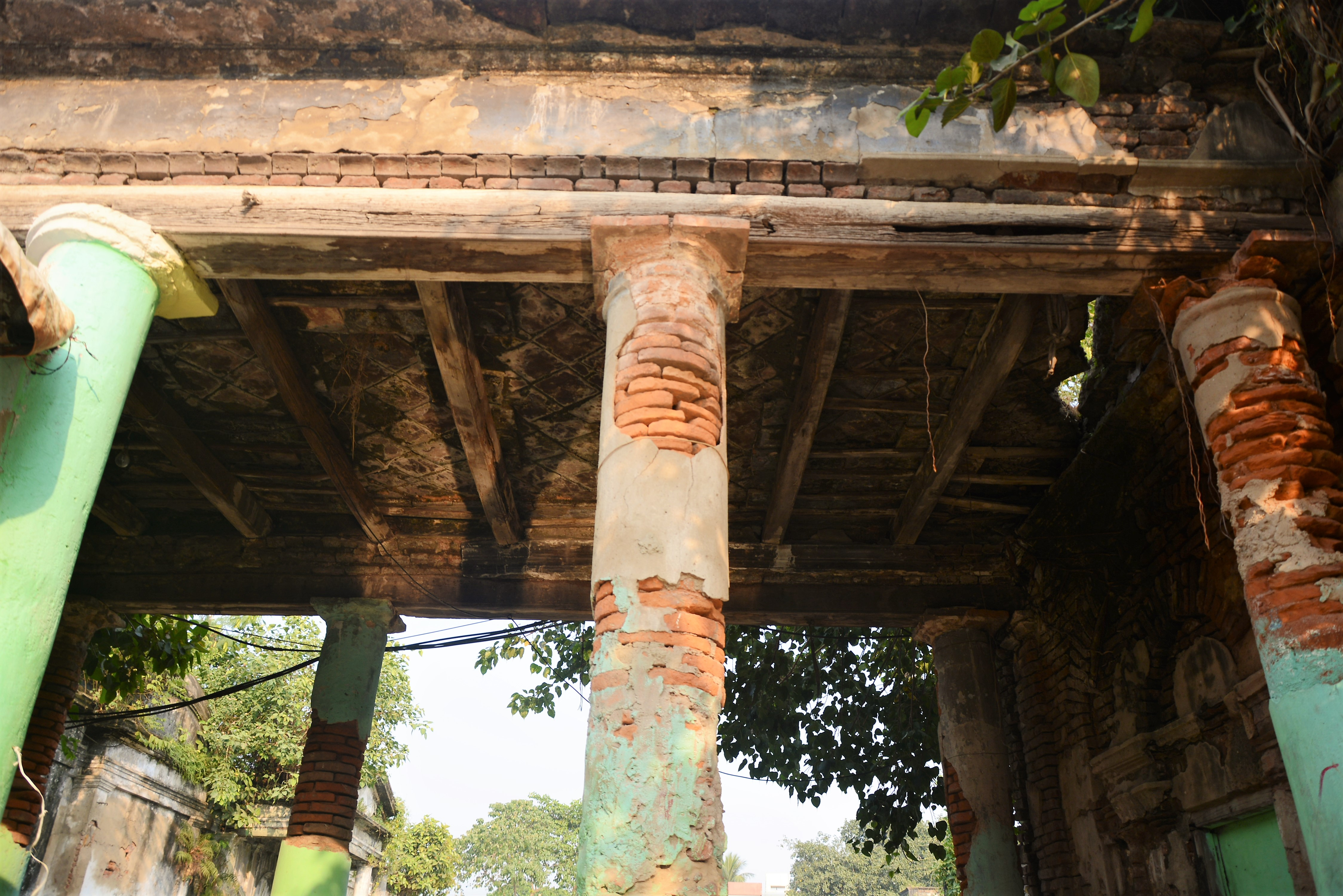
Choto Rasbari Ghat

== Architecture ==
The temple complex comprises a nabaratna (nine pinnacled) temple and two pancha ratna (five pinnacled) temples on either side. There are also ten aat-chala (eight roofed) Shiva temples. Here ratna means pinnacle and chala stands for roof. All the temples are on a raised platform. The entire temple complex is within a large courtyard consisting of black and white marbles in 'checkered pattern'. The navaratna temple is dedicated to Gopalji. The idol of Shyamsundarji, which was previously brought from Bawali, South 24 Parganas is also worshipped here along with Gopalji. There are also three aatchala temples outside the complex.

== Culture ==
Of the twelve Shiva temples apart from the nabaratna temple of Goipalji, each temple has a Shiva lingam made of kosthi pathar (touchstone) with a separate name. To name them from the north-eastern side are Bhuvaneswar, Ramchandraeswar, Kailashnath, Bhutnath, Sareswar, Gobindachandraeswar, Nakuleswar, Kamalakanteswar, Bholonath, Taraknath, Ratneswar and Gopeswar. One thing to note here is that there is a small adjacent room mainly used to keep the naibidya. The rest three Shiva temples which are situated outside the main temple complex are meant for worship for the general public and are dedicated to Shambhunathji, Biswanathji and Nilkantheswar. The temple of Nilkanthesewar has perished in Adi Ganga more than eighty years ago, according to the head priest of the temple.

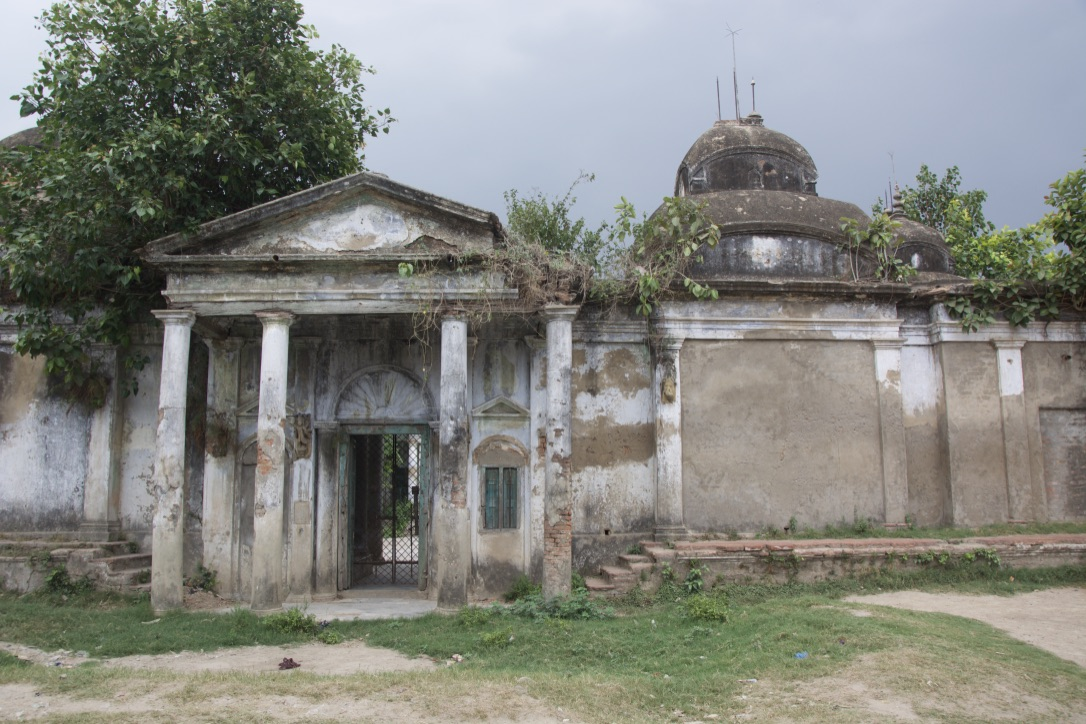
Choto Rasbari

== Festival ==
The main festival here is Rash; but unlike the Rash festival which is held in the Bengali month of Kartick (November), it is celebrated here in the month of Chaitra (March–April) on a full moon day and it is a four-day affair. On the first day, the idol of Shyamsundarji is first coloured in Balaram besh (white colour); on the second day Rakhal besh (black colour); on the third day in Gouranga besh (saffron colour) and on the last day it is bhanga rash i.e., the end of the festival. Apart from Rash festival, other festivals which are celebrated every year are Phul Dol, Snanyatra, Rathayatra, Janmastami and Jhulanyatra. Earlier Rash festival was celebrated with pomp and splendour. Previously there was a rath or chariot which was not used for a long time; but only in 2018, it again took to the road and this chariot had pictures from Kalighat paintings.

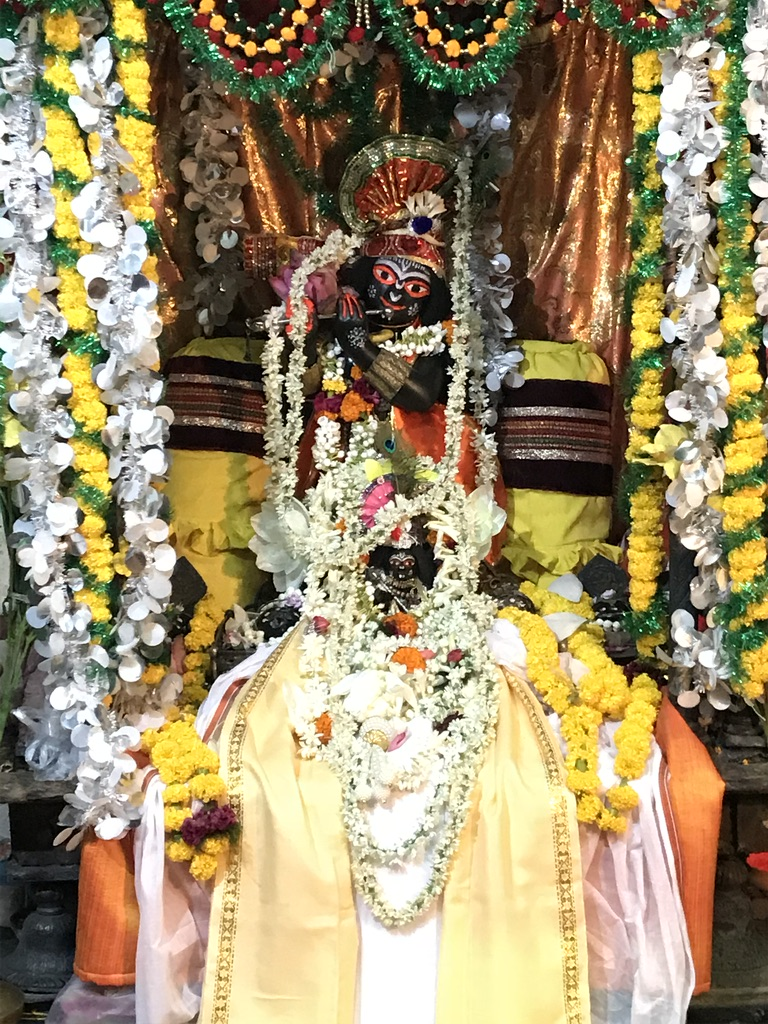
Choto Rasbari

There was also a Rashmancha made of Mahogany wood and though, currently in disuse, it contains stories from Krishnalila. Here the idol was placed during the time of Rash festival.

== See also ==
- Radhakanta Temple, Chetla
