= Bawali Raj =

Bengali Dynasty of Zamindars and Zamindari Estate

Bawali Raj Bawali Mondal Family
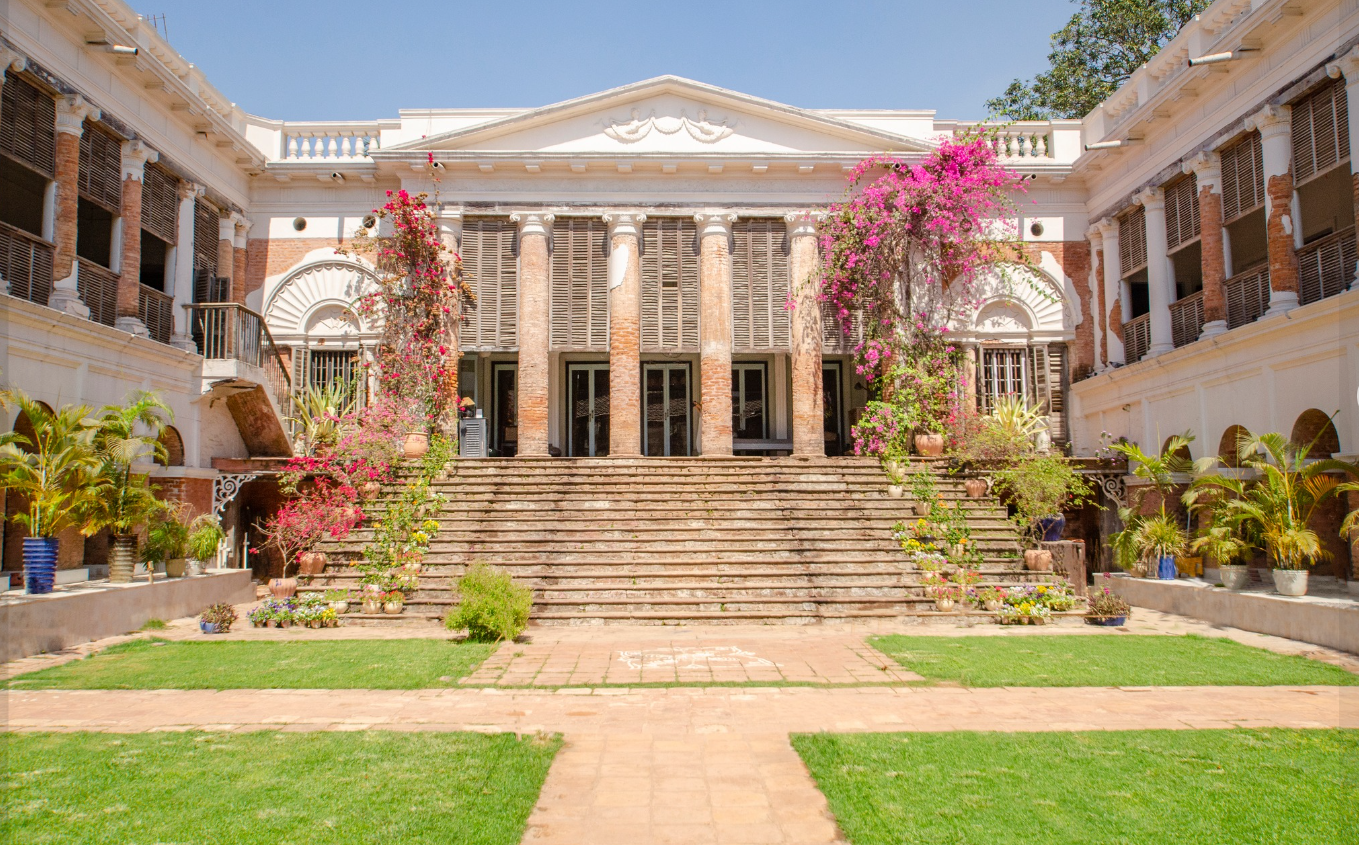
- The Bawali Rajbari, the ancestorial seat of the family at Bawali
- Country: India
- Current region: Bawali, Chetla, West Bengal
- Origin: Varendra region, Bengal
- Founded: 15th Century onwards
- Founder: Raja Sobharam Ray
- Titles: Raja of Bawali, Babus of Chetla
- Styles: Raja; Rai-Raiyan; Babu
- Connected members: Janbazar Raj
- Estates: Bawali Rajbari, Chetla
- Cadet branches: Mondal family - Bawali family branch; Mondal family - Chetla family branch

The Bawali Mondal family, also known as the Bawali Raj family (Bengali: বাওয়ালি মন্ডল পরিবার), was a prominent zamindar (landlord) family of Bengal, with a lineage that dates back to the Mughal era, they were Mahishyas by caste. Their seat of power was located in Bawali, a village in South 24 Parganas near Kolkata, and in the early half of the 19th century in Chetla area of Calcutta in present-day West Bengal, India. They played a significant role in developing the region's cultural and architectural heritage.

The family was awarded as much as 3 lakh bighas of land in the South 24 Parganas and ownership of more than 50 villages that included Bawali and Budge Budge as a token of gratitude by the Mughal Commander Raja Man Singh for the crucial aid they rendered during the Mughal conquest of Bengal. Subsequent generations built and developed the area and were largely responsible for its cultural and architectural growth. The prominent members of the family are as follows:

- Basudev Ray (Earliest known ancestor, the patriarch of the family)
- Raja Sovaram Ray (was awarded the title of Mandal)
- Raja Rajaram Mandal (Was an associate of Man Singh I and the Senapati of the Raja of Hijli)
- Babu Haradhan Mandal (Acquired huge wealth, was a trading partner of the East India Company)
- Babu Ramnath Mandal (Migrated to Chetla, Calcutta on the invitation of Robert Clive)

== History ==
The family's lineage traces back to Basudev Ray, a devout Gaudiya Vaishnav and a Mahishya by caste and an inhabitant of the Basantapur village, and a high-ranking official in Emperor Akbar's court. His grandson, Shovaram Ray, was awarded the title Mondal by the Raja of Hijli. Sovaram was succeeded by his son Meghnad. Subsequently, Rajaram, Meghnad's son and Shovaram's grandson, was granted ownership of several villages, including Bawali, by the Mughal authorities as a reward. Sovaram Ray was also, a trusted ally of Raja Man Singh of Amber and a commander of the Mughal Emperor Akbar. Shovaram suppressed rebellions and pirates with great skill, thus he came to the attention of Man Singh and Akbar. Pleased, Raja Man Singh granted him a dominion of 3 lakh bighas of land on the emperor's orders, and gave him the title of "Mandal", abolishing the title of "Roy". The Mondals established their residence in Bawali by the early 17th century.

Rajaram was a very astute military commander and a hugely efficient administrator, he could device effective strategies. During the reign of Mughal Emperor Shah Jahan and Aurangzeb, he had played a very important role of suppressing revolts in different parts of Bengal. It is said that he was the primary reason why the Mughal Empire could suppress the mutiny and insurgency. As an appreciation for his contributions, he received a Royal Charter called Firman from the Mughal court, granting him the ownership of 15 villages and huge tracts of land. From his time to the time before Haradhan Mondal, the family served as officials to the Mughal Empire. Rajaram's great grandson Haradhan, who became a trading partner of East India Company, and his sons built many temples in Bawali turning the nondescript village into a "temple town".

Haradhan had seven sons, among them Ramnath and Manik Chandra Mondal moved to Chetla on the invitation of Robert Clive. The practice of Sati was prevalent in the family, which was later abolished due to the efforts of Rani Rashmoni, who was their relative through marriage. Muktakeshi Debi, the wife of Babu Manik Chandra Mondal, one of the ancestors of the family committed Sati, on her husband's pyre, on the banks of the Adi Ganga, in the temple complex of "Dwadosh Shiva", one of the numerous temples built by the family in the Chetla area, near Tollygunge, back in 1817, her ornaments and sindoor are still preserved and worshipped by the family members.

== Cultural contributions ==
Under the leadership of Harananda Mondal, the family flourished, becoming influential landowners and patrons of the arts. They transformed Bawali into a temple town, constructing numerous temples dedicated to Lord Krishna. The temples are renowned for their exquisite terracotta work and intricate floral motifs. Notable among these is the Navaratna (nine-domed) Gopinath Jiu Temple, built in 1794.

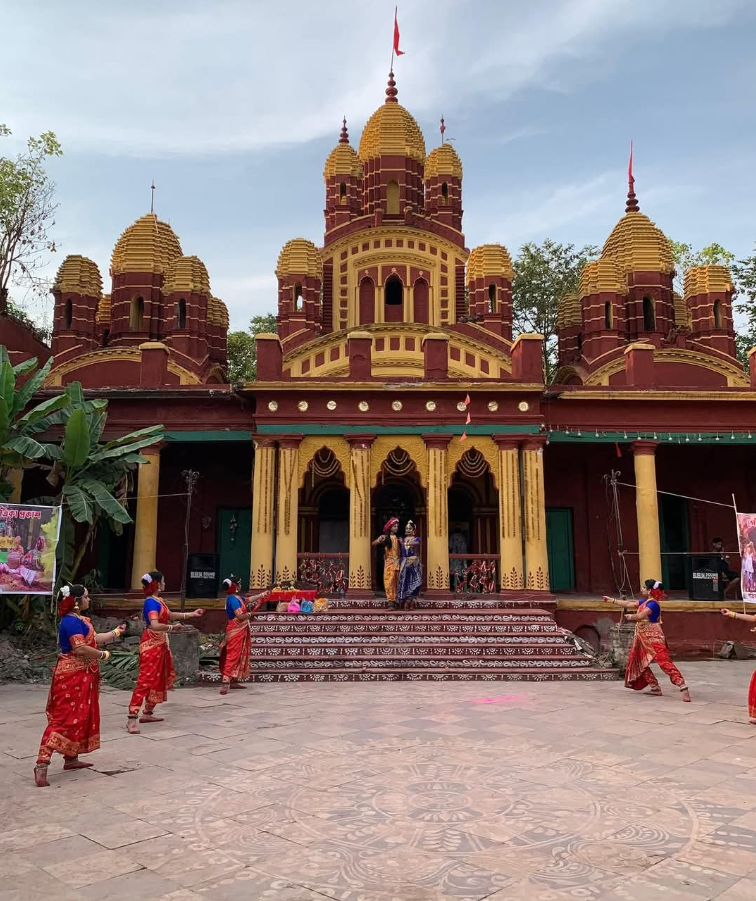
Bawali Rasmancha

The Mondals also constructed the Rajbari Bawali, a grand two-storied mansion spread over three acres. This architectural masterpiece served as the family's residence and a center of cultural activities. It has been now turned into a grand hotel. The Rajbari is now a heritage site, showcasing the opulence and grandeur of the era.

Historians suggest that the architectural style of Rani Rashmoni's Dakshineswar Kali Temple was inspired by the Navaratna style of Radhakanta temples of the Mondal family.

== Temple establishment ==
- In 1771, Harananda Mandal built the temple of Radhakanta Jiu in Bawali.
- In 1794, he established the Navaratna Temple of Gopinath Jiu.

They also built twelve Shiva temples, a terracotta Gopinath temple, temples of gods and goddesses like Jagannath, Lakshmi, Janardana, Chandimata, Rajarajeshwari etc. A remarkable creation of this Mandal family was the Jaltungi. Such architecture was a novelty in Bengal at that time.

Boro Rasbari

Boro Rasbari lies in the south Kolkata area historically known as Chetla Tollygunge, along the banks of Adi Ganga. Historically, Adi Ganga was a major waterway, part of the old flow of the Ganga, used by pilgrims. Temples and ghats sprang up along its banks. The temple was built around 1828, by Babu Uday Narayan Mondal, the son of Babu Manik Chandra Mondal.

Many aristocratic zamindar families like the Bawali Mondal family, settled along these banks and built temples, mansions, and estates. For them, proximity to the river and access to waterway-based trade or transport was important. The main aatchala temple in Boro Rasbari is, according to recent descriptions, still in use, though only partially. The 12 smaller temples on the outer sides, however, are reportedly in a “deplorable state”, many in ruin.

Choto Rasbari

Choto Rasbari, located in the Chetla, Tollygunge area of south Kolkata, was built in 1847 by Babu Pyarelal Mondal and Monimohan Mondal, two sons of the Babu Ramnath Mondal, who were prominent zamindars settled along the banks of the historic Adi Ganga. Constructed as a distinctive temple complex, it centers on a navaratna (nine-pinnacled) shrine dedicated to Krishna, flanked by two pancharatna temples and a row of smaller aatchala shrines, mainly devoted to Shiva, arranged around a spacious courtyard. The complex was closely associated with the local Rash festival, traditionally celebrated here in the month of Chaitra, with rituals conducted on the rasmancha and processions that once connected the temple to the nearby river ghat. Over time, the decline of the Adi Ganga waterway, urban congestion, and insufficient maintenance have led to deterioration of parts of the complex, yet Choto Rasbari continues to stand as a rare surviving example of nineteenth-century Bengal temple architecture and as a living reminder of the religious and cultural life that once thrived along Kolkata’s historic river routes.

Radhanath Temple

The Radhanath Temple in Chetla, Kolkata, stands as a remarkable symbol of the religious and architectural legacy of the Mondal family who settled along the banks of the old waterway Adi Ganga in the late 18th century. Construction of the temple began in 1796 under Ramnath Mondal and was completed in 1807, with consecration taking place in 1809 as indicated by a stone inscription in an older Bengali script at the site. The temple is built in the traditional Bengal nabaratna (nine-pinnacled) style, rising impressively to about 90–110 feet, and was constructed using handmade bricks and imported marble. Inside, the sanctum houses idols of Radhakanta (a form of Krishna) carved in black stone, along with those of Radha and Lakshmi Narayan made from astadhatu (an alloy of eight metals). Surrounding the temple was once a flat-roofed nat mandir and a “rasmancha”, a raised platform used during festivals though the rasmancha has since collapsed. The architecture of the temple is said to have been an inspiration for the Dakshineswar Kali temple.

Beyond its religious function, Radhanath Temple is historically and culturally significant as a representation of an era when the banks of Adi Ganga formed a spiritual-geographical network of ghats, paths, and temples patronized by affluent landlord families a way of life that has largely disappeared from modern Kolkata. Its grand nabaratna architecture, solemn idols, and the heritage of the Mondal family’s temple-building reflect the fusion of devotion, social standing, and local identity of the time. Despite the passage of more than two centuries and the shift in urban landscape, the temple, cared for by descendants of the Mondal family continues to stand.

Contributions to the Kalighat Kali Temple

In 1843, Babu Uday Narayan Mondal, established the present day ShyamRai temple in the Kalighat Temple square. In 1858 a Dal Mancha was installed by Madan Gopal Koley, also a relative of the family, for the ShyamRai temple.

== Chetla branch ==
It appears that in the late 18th century, a branch of the family moved upwards to the Chetla area, on the banks of Adi Ganga, in the Southern parts of Calcutta on the invitation of the Governor General Robert Clive himself. Babu Ramnath Mondal, the eldest son of Haradhan Mondal built the Radhakanta Temple which was also of Nabaratna style by the side of Adi Ganga in the modern day Chetla in Tollygunge area of Calcutta. It is 110 feet in height and the construction work began in 1796, was completed in 1807, and the temple was opened 1809. This temple also had a nat mandir. It is said that this temple was the inspiration for the Dakshineswar Kali Temple built by Rani Rashmoni of the Janbazar Raj family. They also had matrimonial relationships with Rani Rashmoni's family, as they belonged to the same caste, the Mahishyas. One of the last Zamindars, Babu Bijoy Kishore Mandal, was descended maternally from the Janbazar Raj, as well as married to another member of the same family but of a different branch. Apart from the temples at Bawali and the Radhakanta Jiu temple, this branch of the family also built many other temples as well such as a part of the Kalighat Kali Temple built by Babu Uday Narayan Mandal and the Boro Rashbari and the Choto Rasbari on the banks of River Adi Ganga by Babus Monimohan and Pyarilal Mandal.

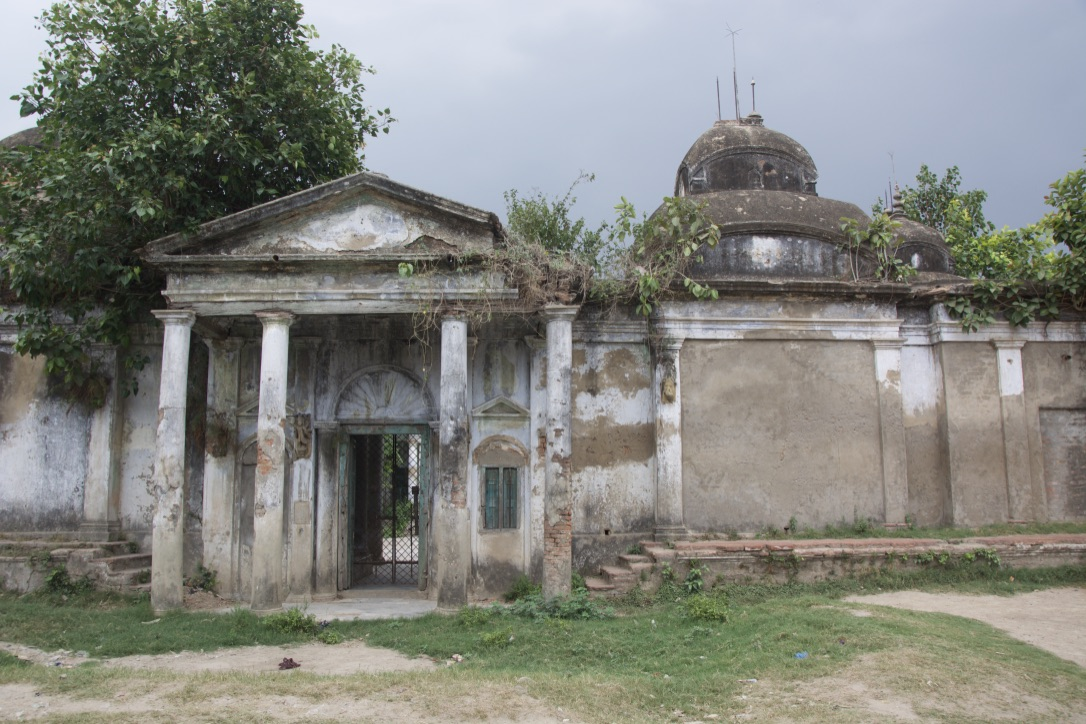
The entry to Choto Rasbari in Chetla

== Legacy ==
Efforts have been made to restore and preserve their legacy. The Rajbari Bawali has been renovated and now operates as a heritage hotel.

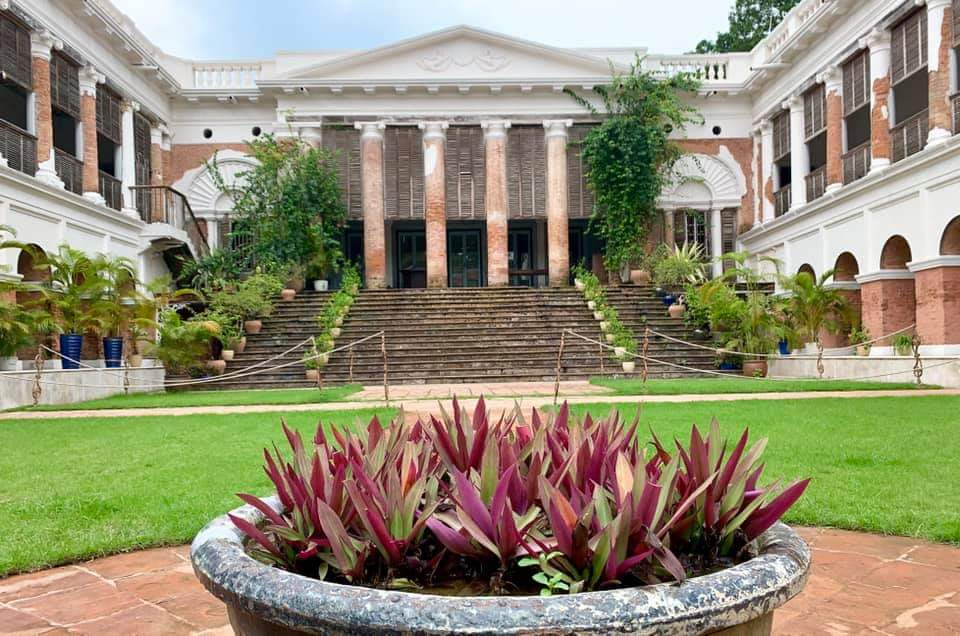
Façade of the 300-year old Bawali Rajbari, with corinthian pillars – has been renovated for use as a hotel.

== Gallery ==
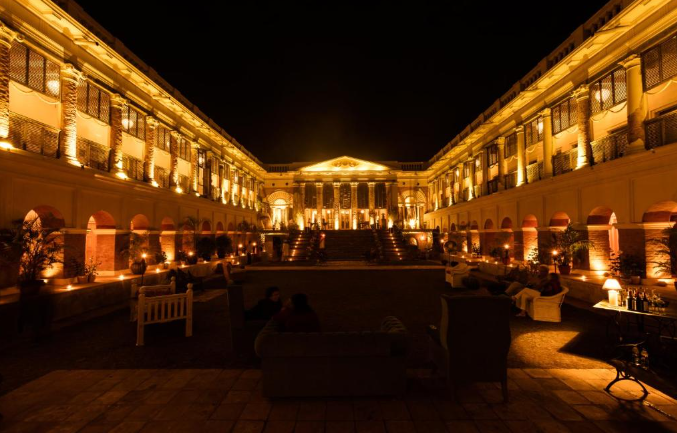
Night view of the Palace (Bawali)

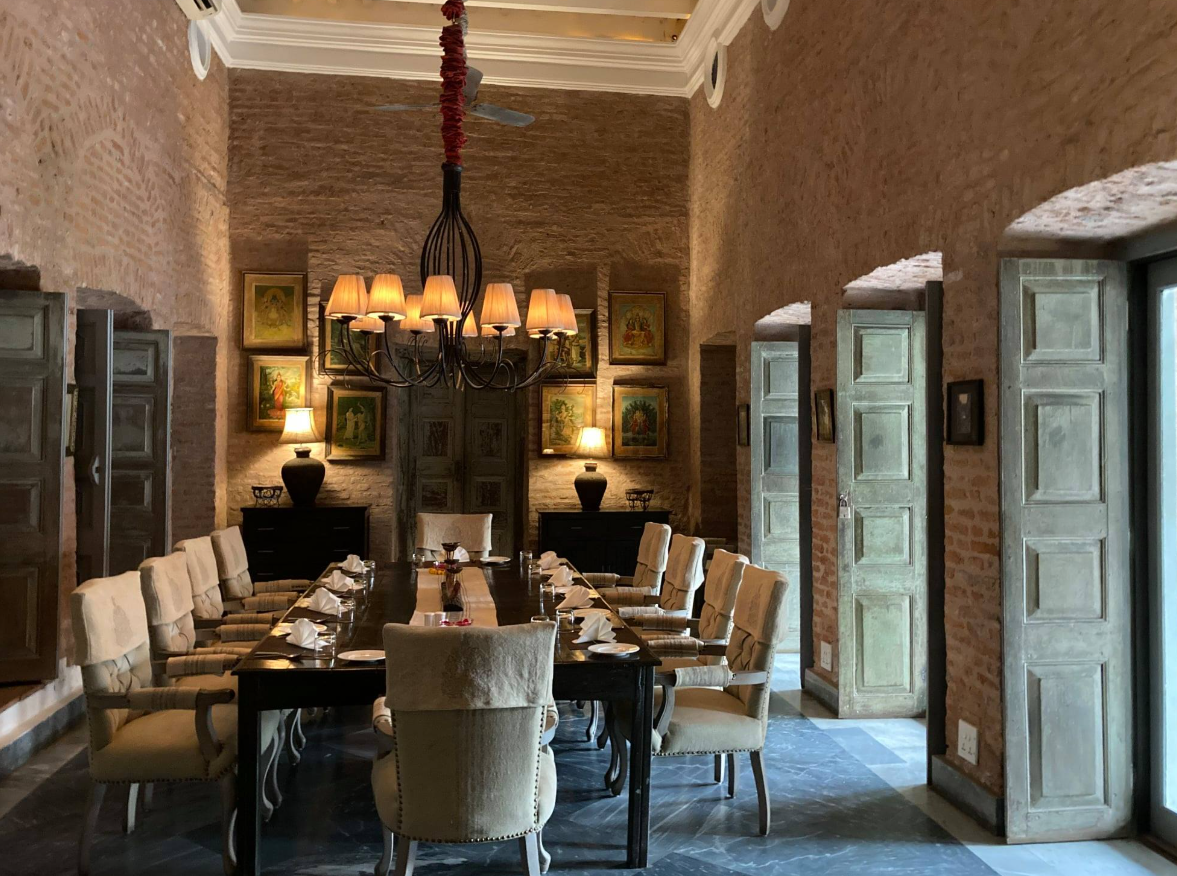
Interior

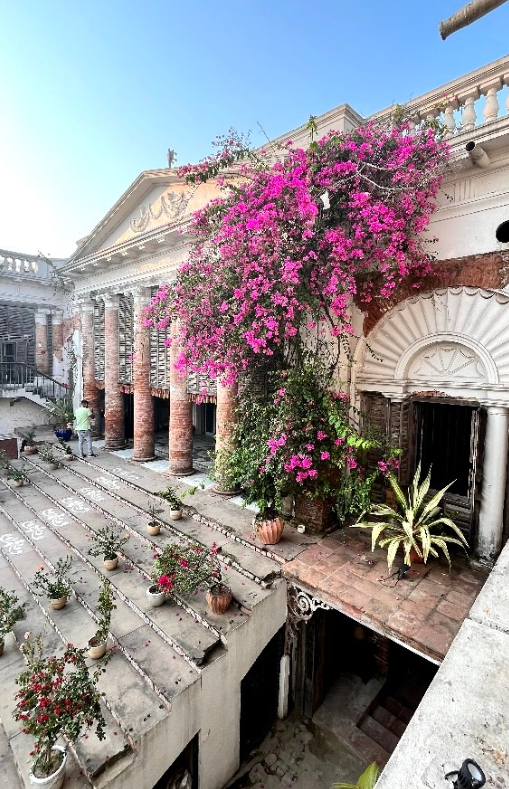
Decorations

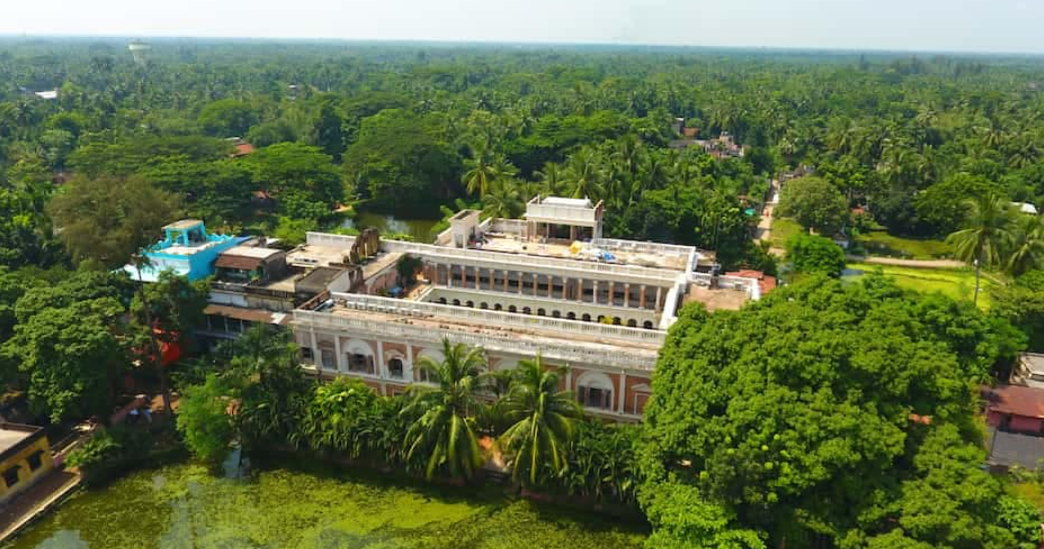
Drone view of the Rajbari

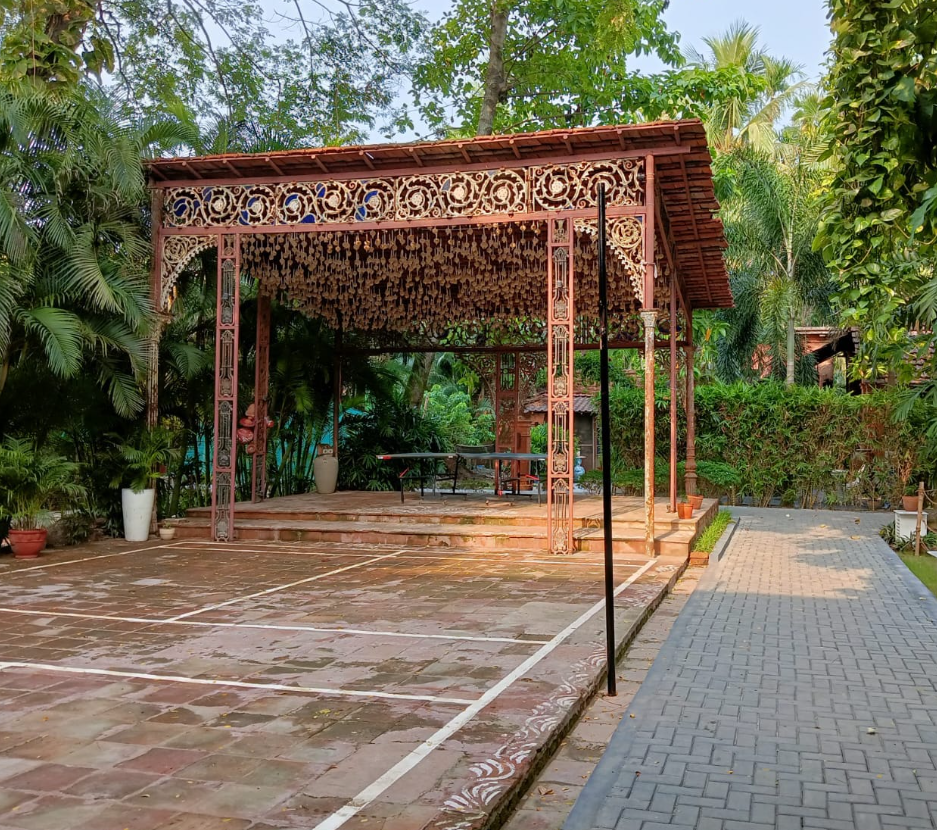
Garden area

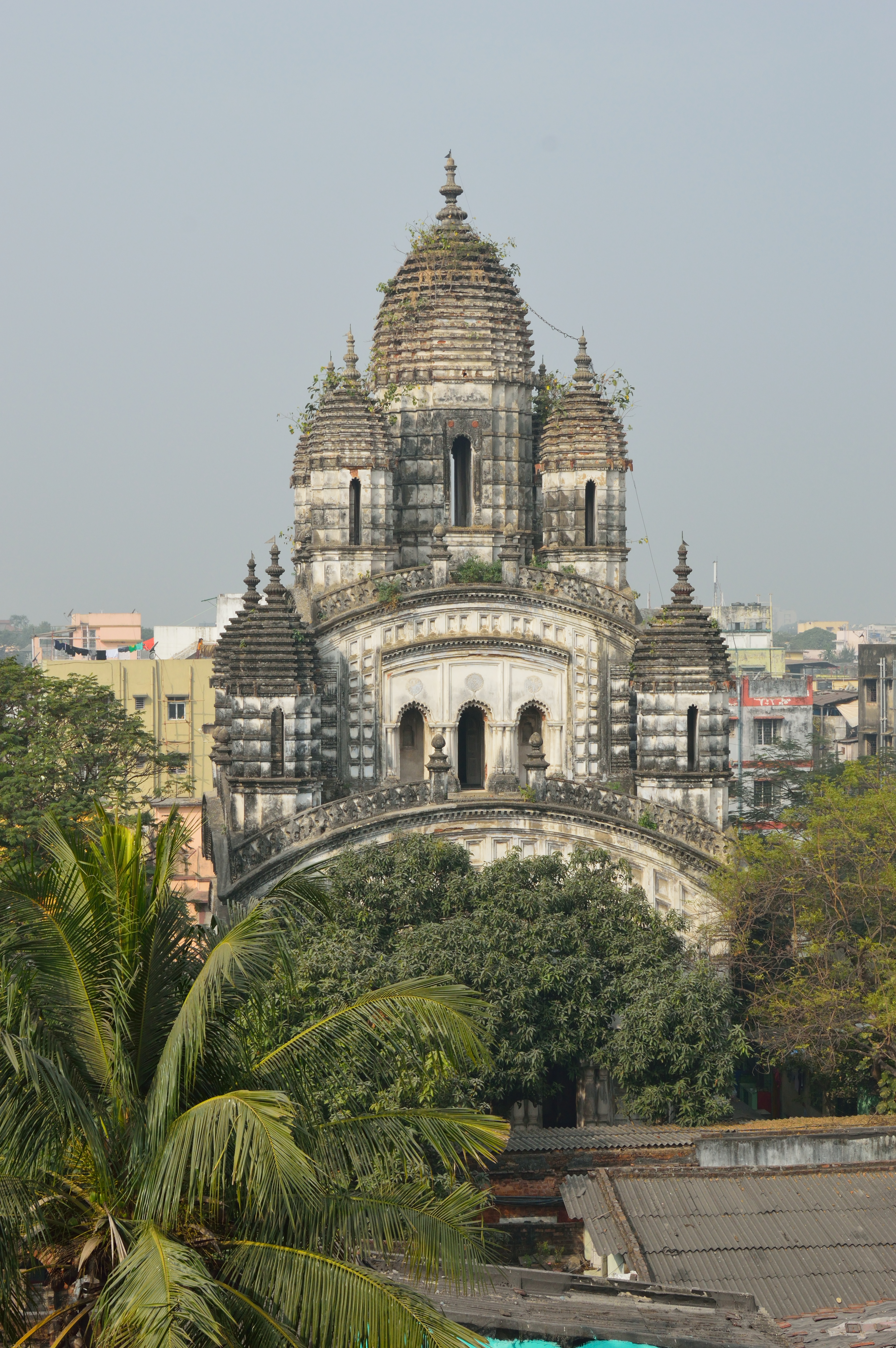
Radhakanta Temple, Chetla

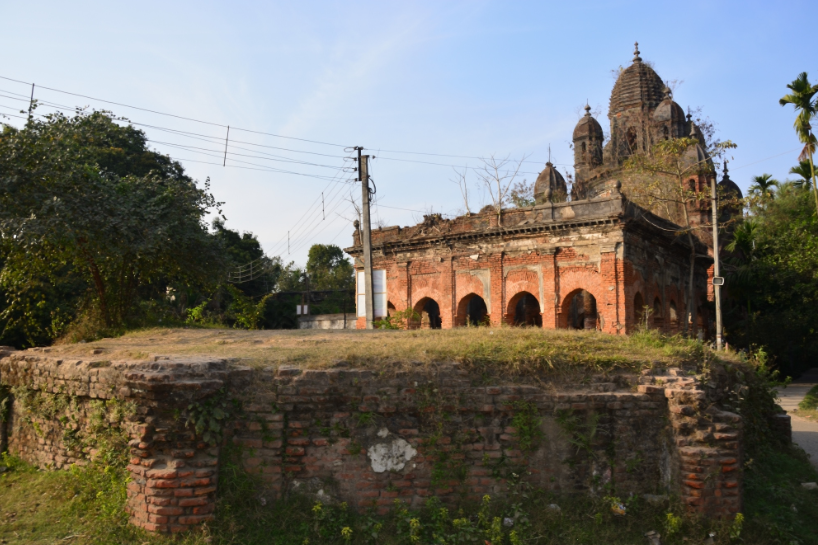
Gopinath Jiu

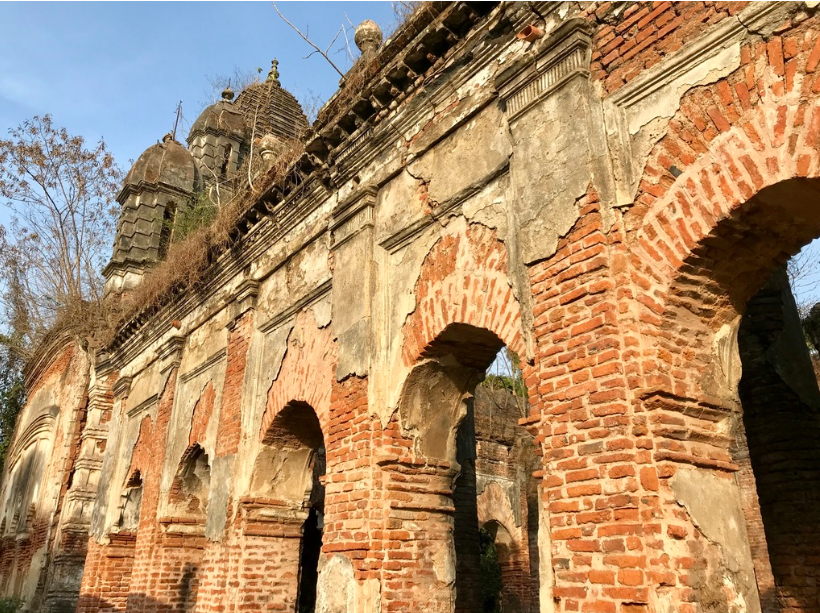
Side view of Gopinath jiu temple

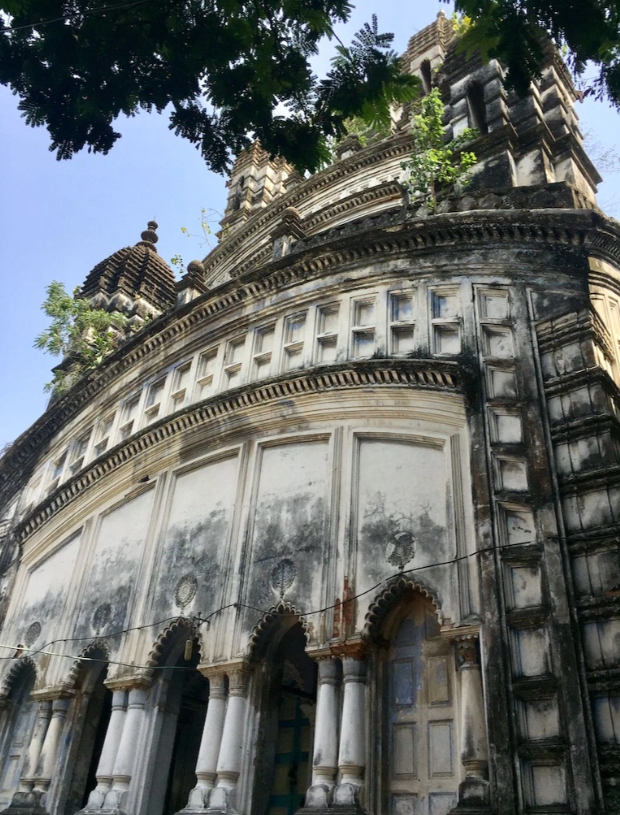
Radhakanta temple

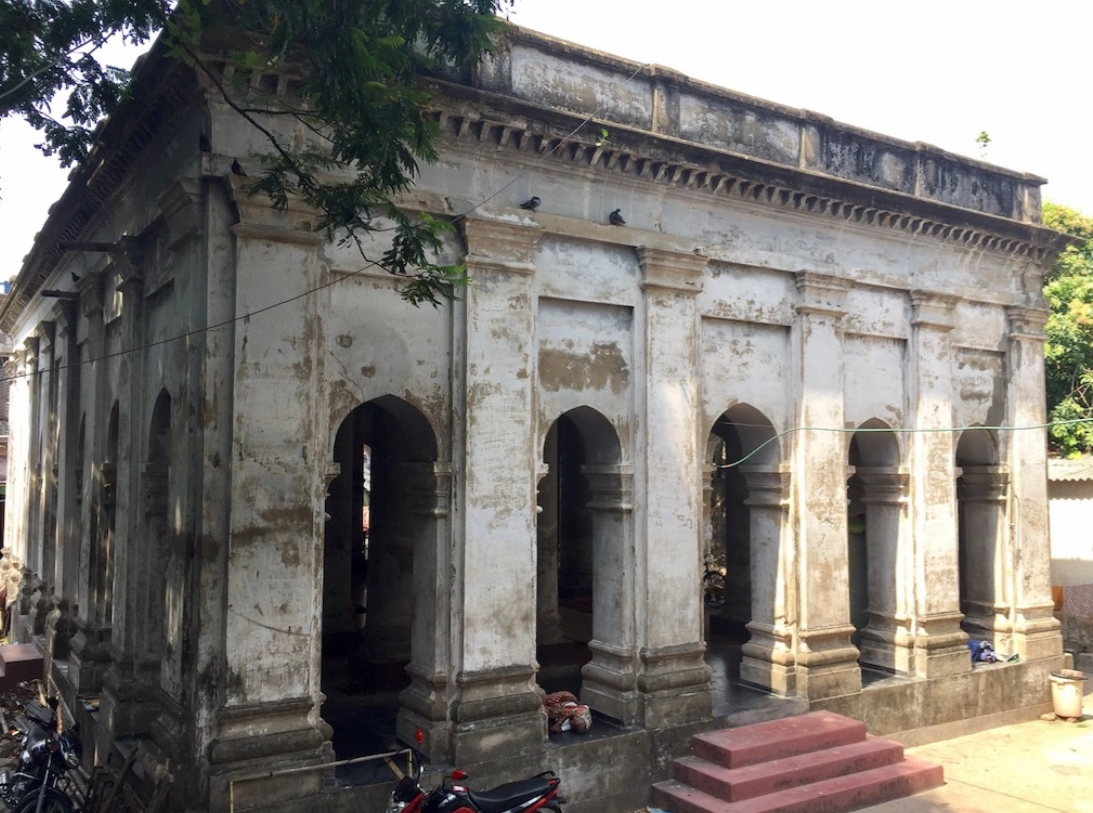
Natmandir

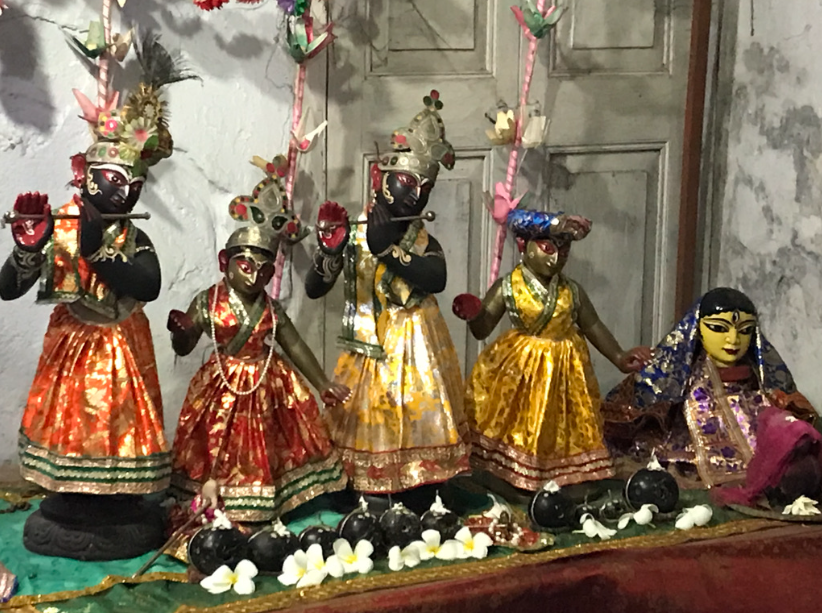
Radha Krishna bigraha

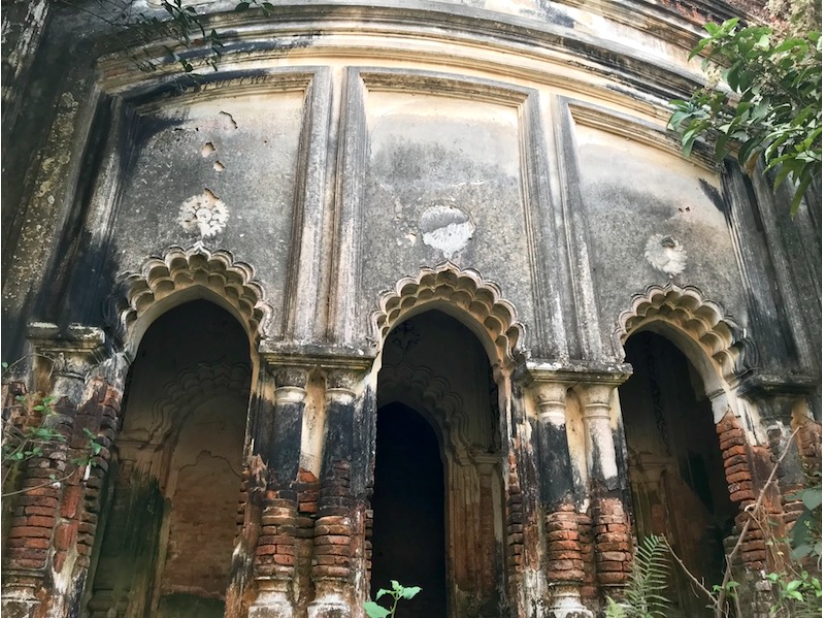
Radhashyamsundar temple

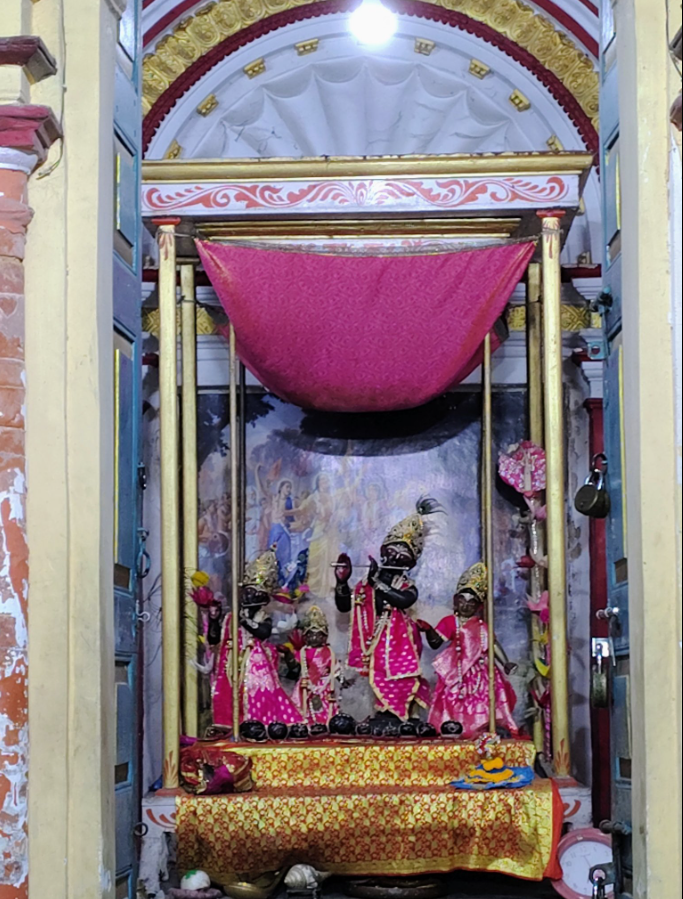
Kuldevta of the Bawali Raj family

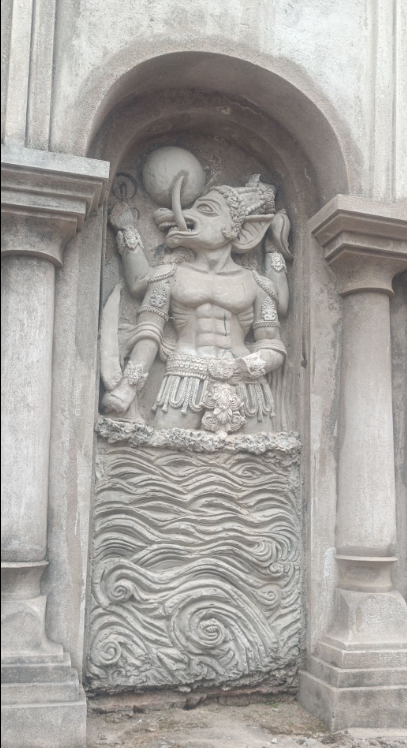
Varah avtar art

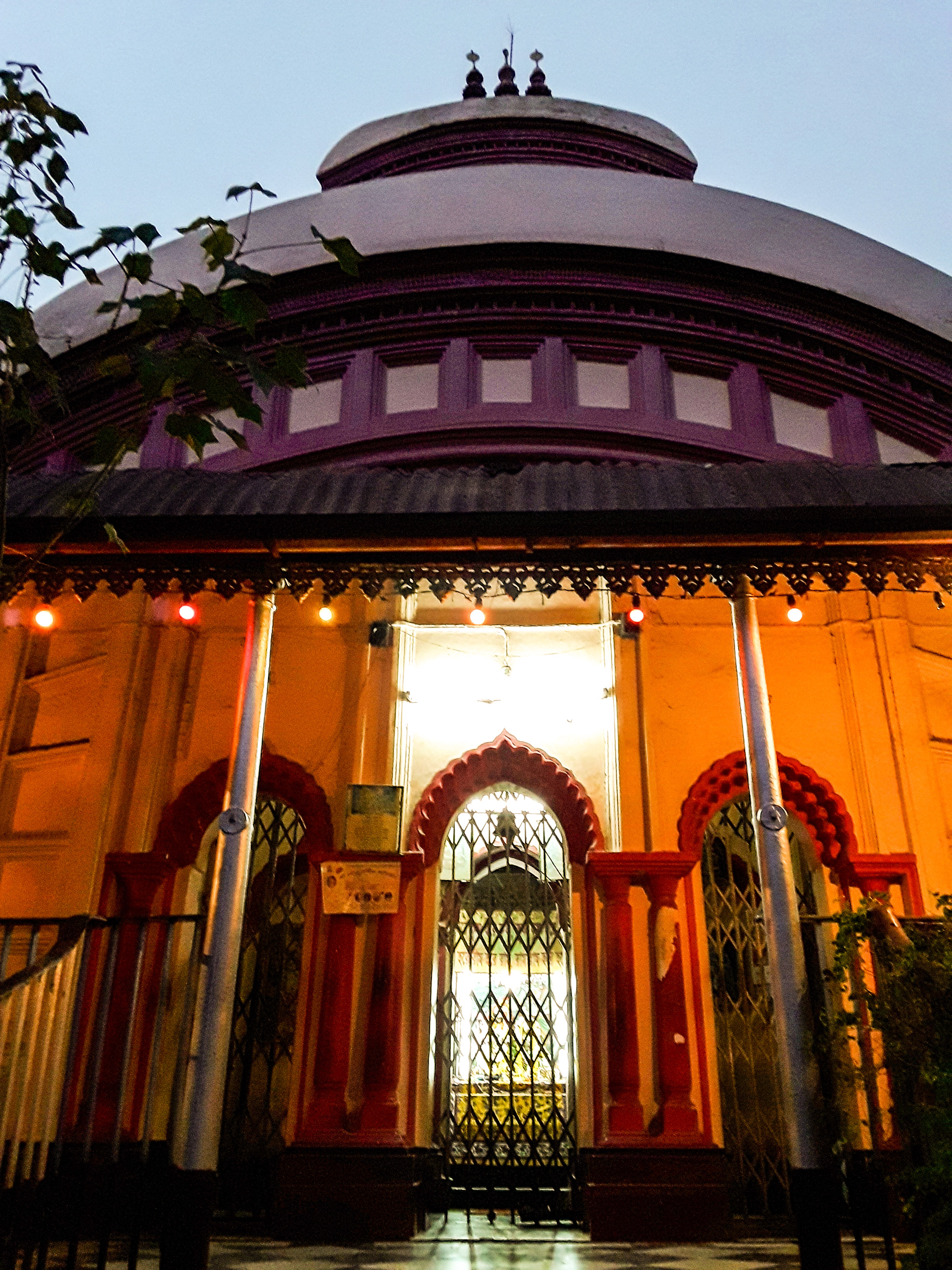
Boro Rashbari

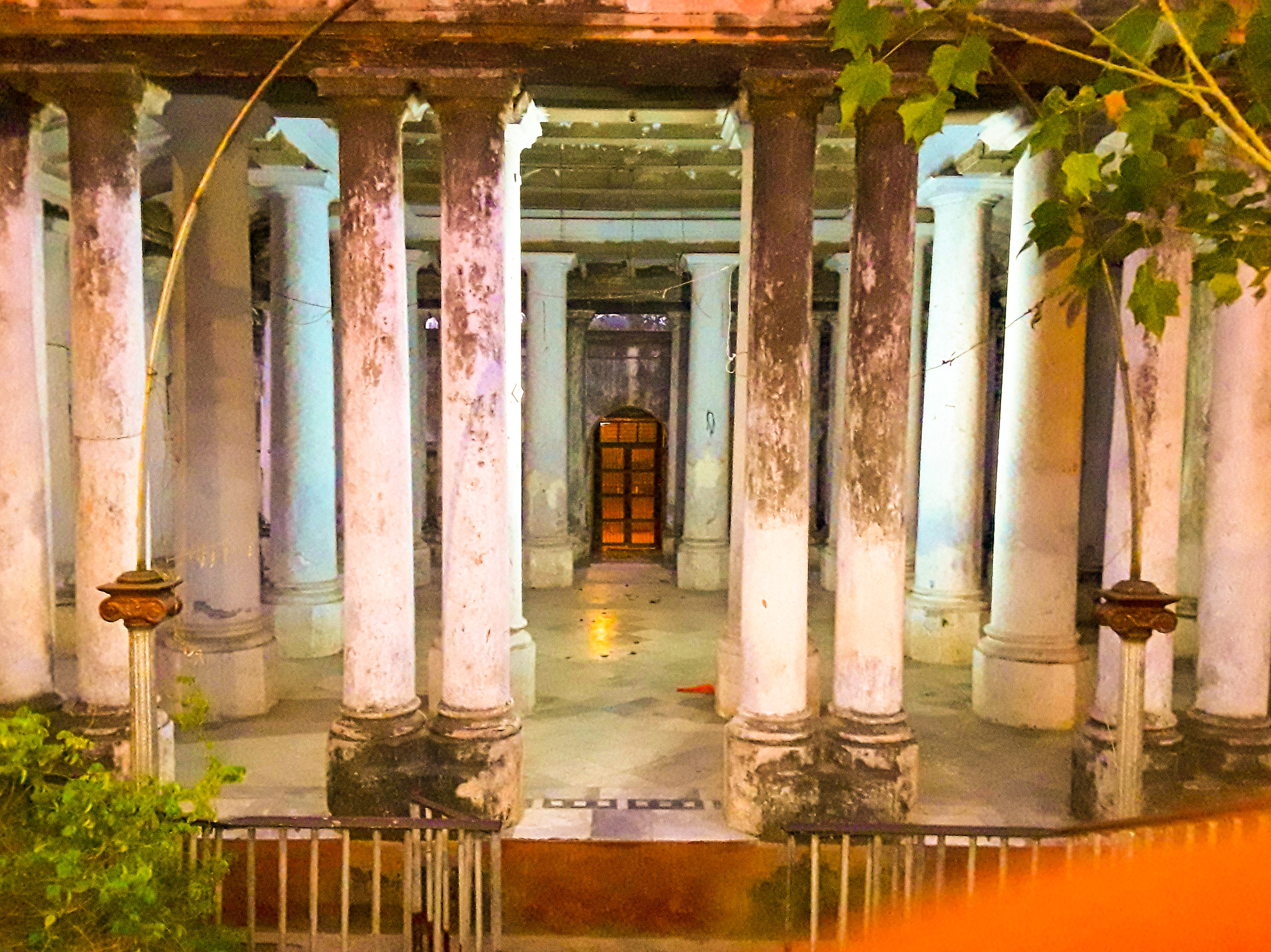
Corinthian Pillars, Boro Rashbari

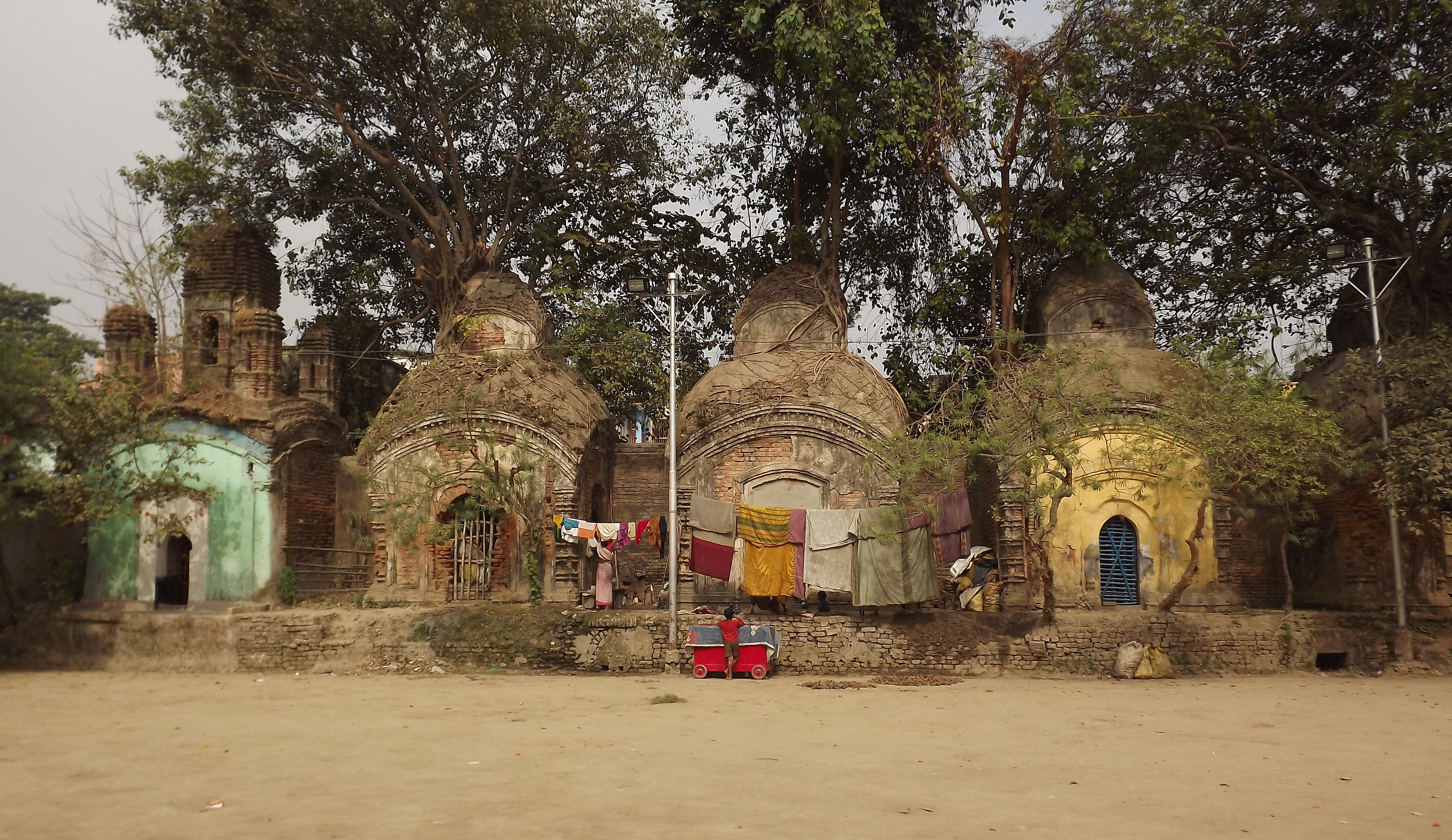
Ruins of Baro Shib mondir, near Boro Rashbari

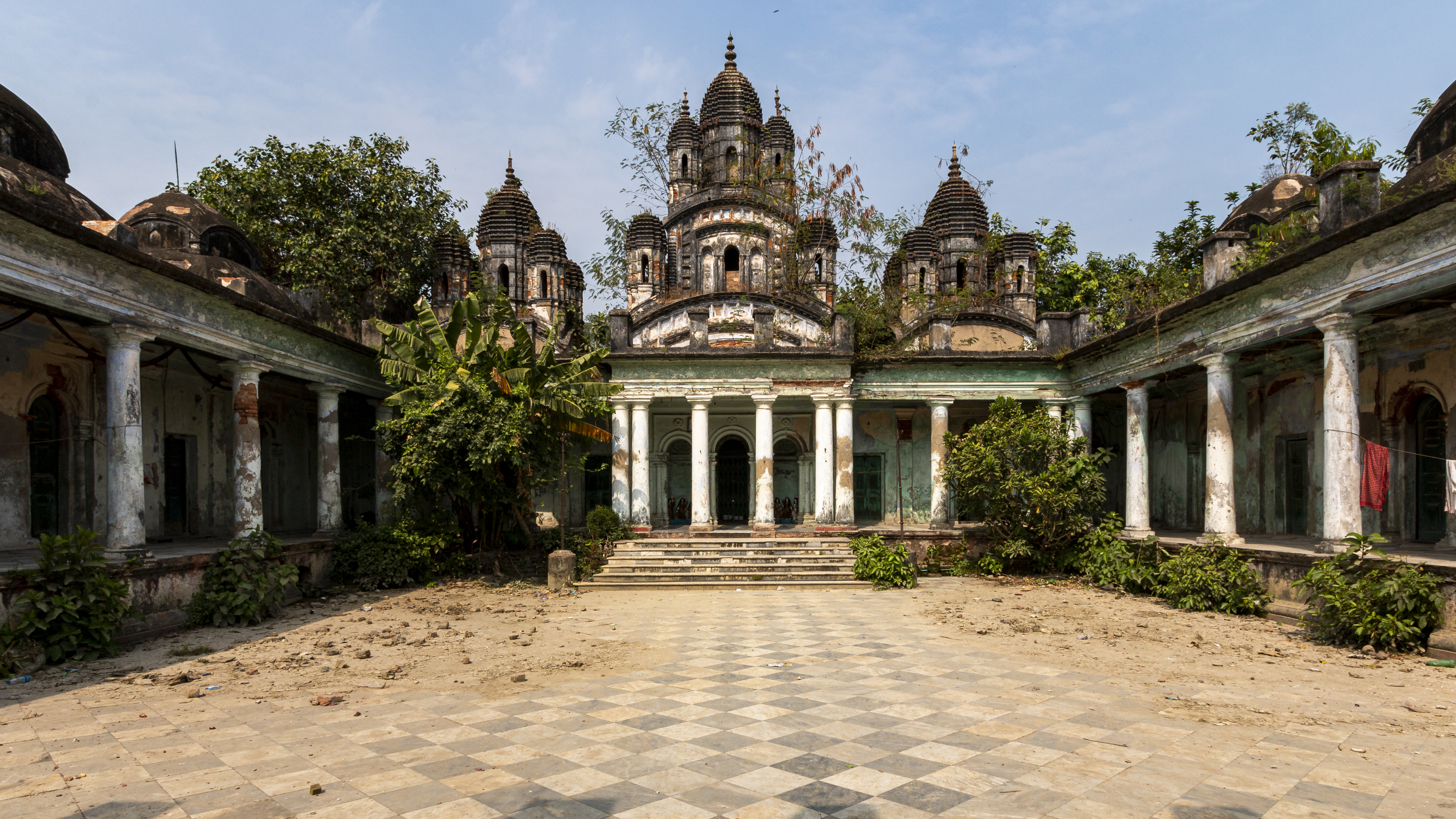
Choto Rasbari

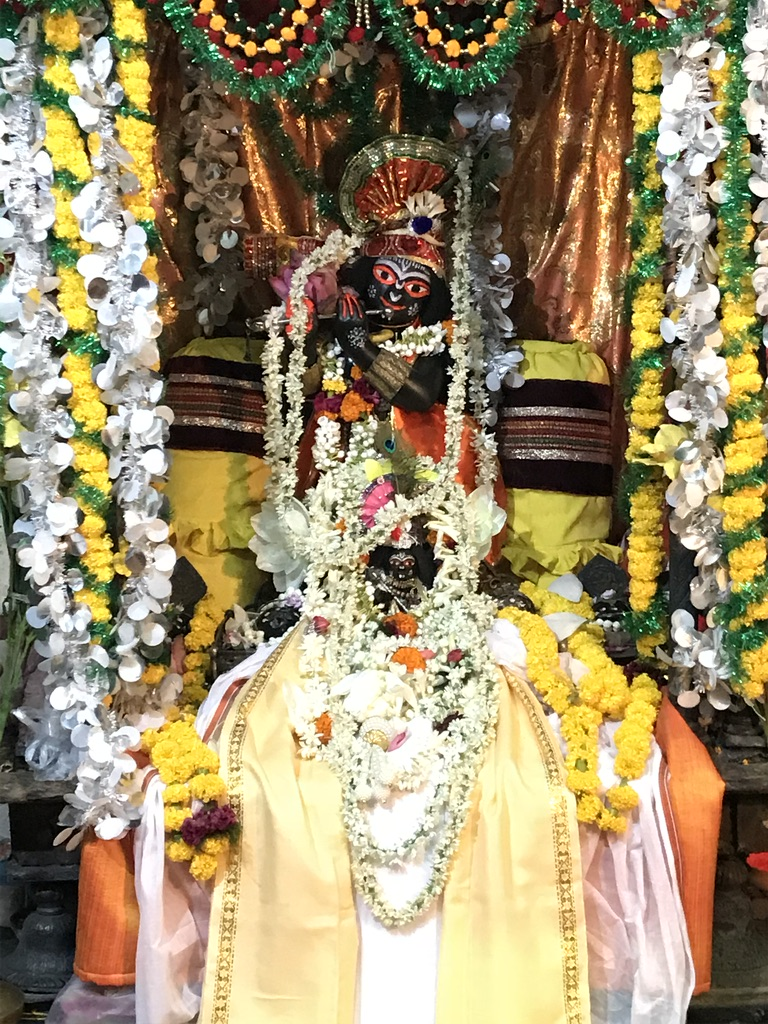
The Deity at Choto Rasbari

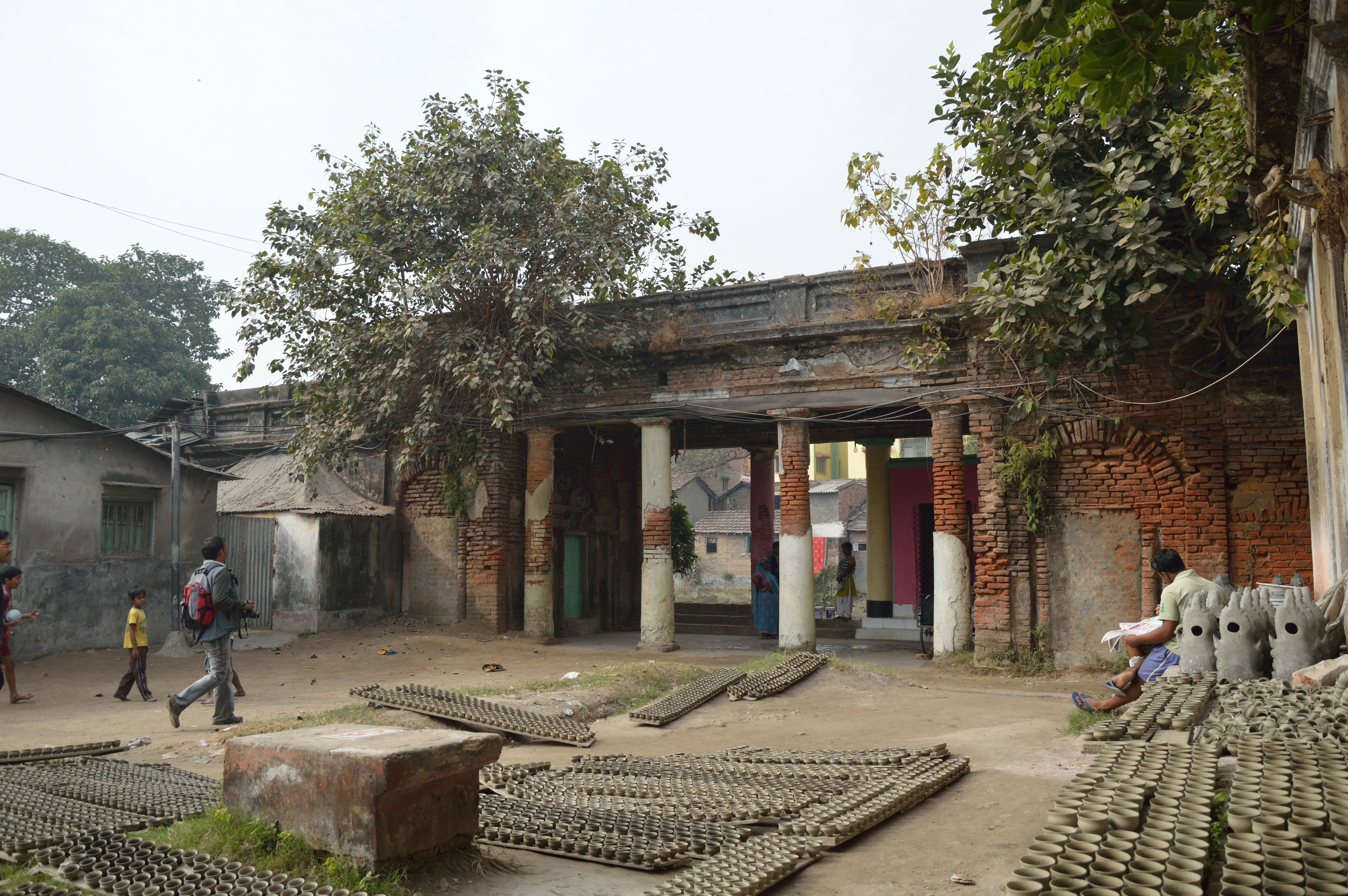
Ghat of Choto Rasbari

Bank of Adi Ganga, where Muktakeshi Debi, possibly committed Sati
