= Radhakanta Temple, Chetla =

Radhakanta Temple
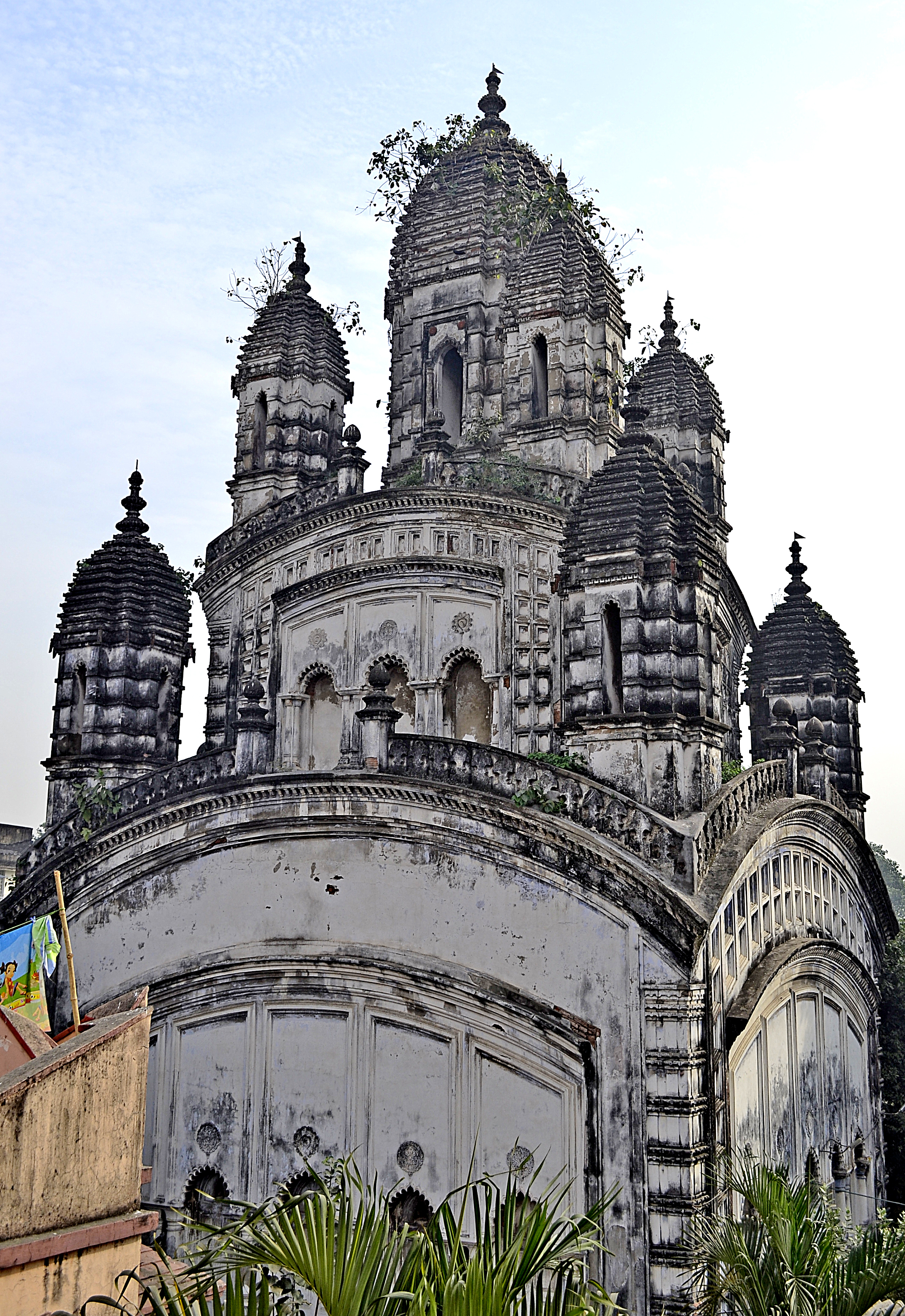
- Radhakanta Temple, Chetla

- Location within West Bengal

Religion
- Affiliation: Hinduism
- District: Kolkata district
- Deity: Radhakanta Jiu

Location
- Location: Kolkata
- State: West Bengal
- Country: India
- Interactive map of Radhakanta Temple
- Coordinates: 22.50612257°N 88.33979846°E

Architecture
- Type: Bengal architecture
- Style: Naba-ratna
- Founder: Bawali Raj
- Completed: 1809; 217 years ago
- Temple: 1 main temple of Radhakanta

The Radhanath Temple in Chetla, India built between 1796 and 1807 by Babu Ramnath Mondal of the Bawali Raj family, is one of the most prominent heritage temples along the old Adi Ganga. Designed in the traditional nabaratna (nine-pinnacled) Bengal temple architectural style and rising nearly 100 feet, it once formed part of a flourishing riverside cultural landscape of ghats, pathways, and zamindari estates. The temple houses the black-stone idol of Radhakanta along with astadhatu idols of Radha and Lakshmi-Narayan, and originally included a nat-mandir and a now-collapsed rasmancha used during festivals.

Even amid modern urbanisation, the temple remains a significant reminder of Kolkata’s early religious architecture and the social-cultural influence of the Mondal family, preserving a rare link to the city's eighteenth- and nineteenth-century heritage. It's also said that this temple was an inspiration for the more famous Dakshineswar Kali Temple.

== Gallery ==
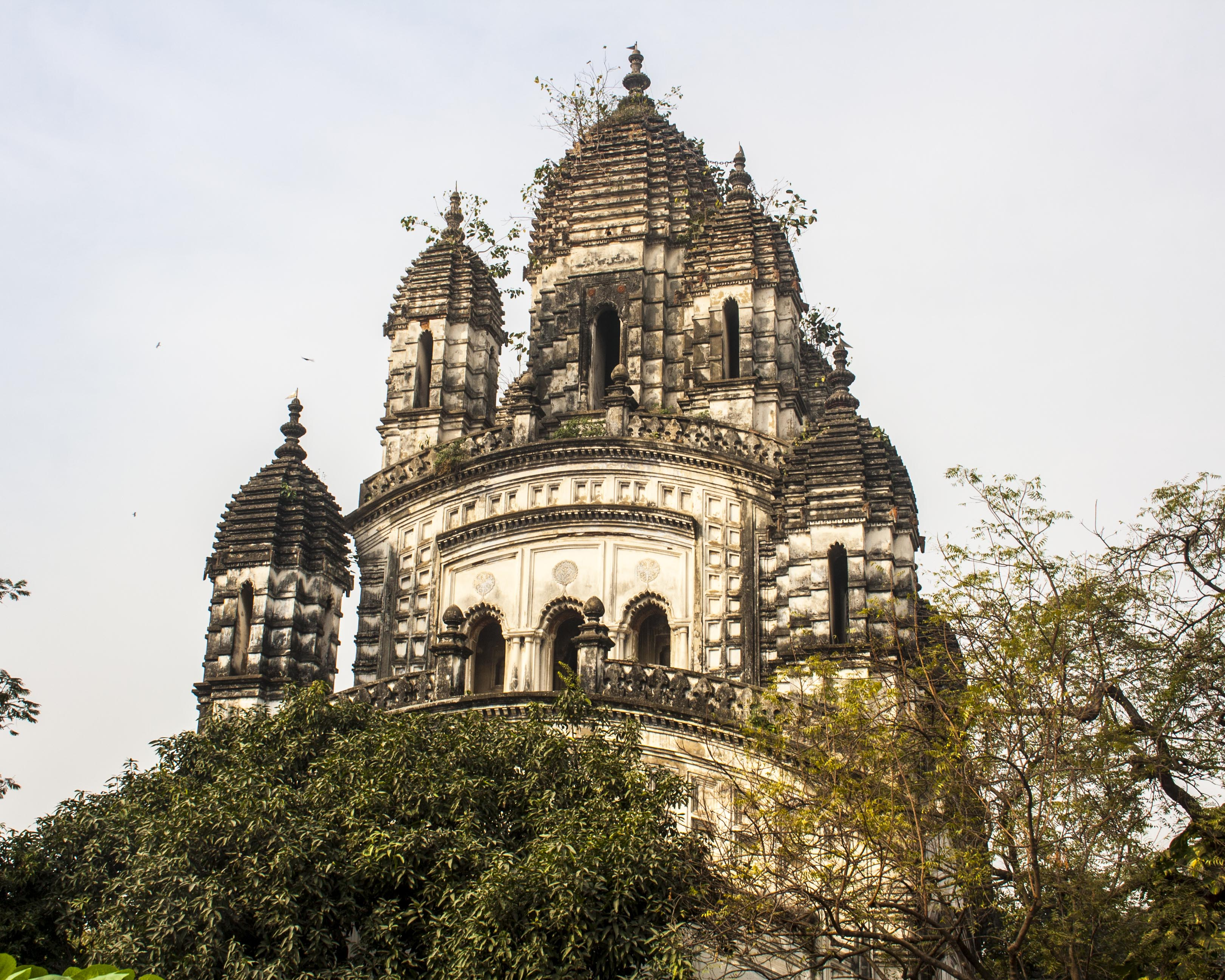
View of the Temple.

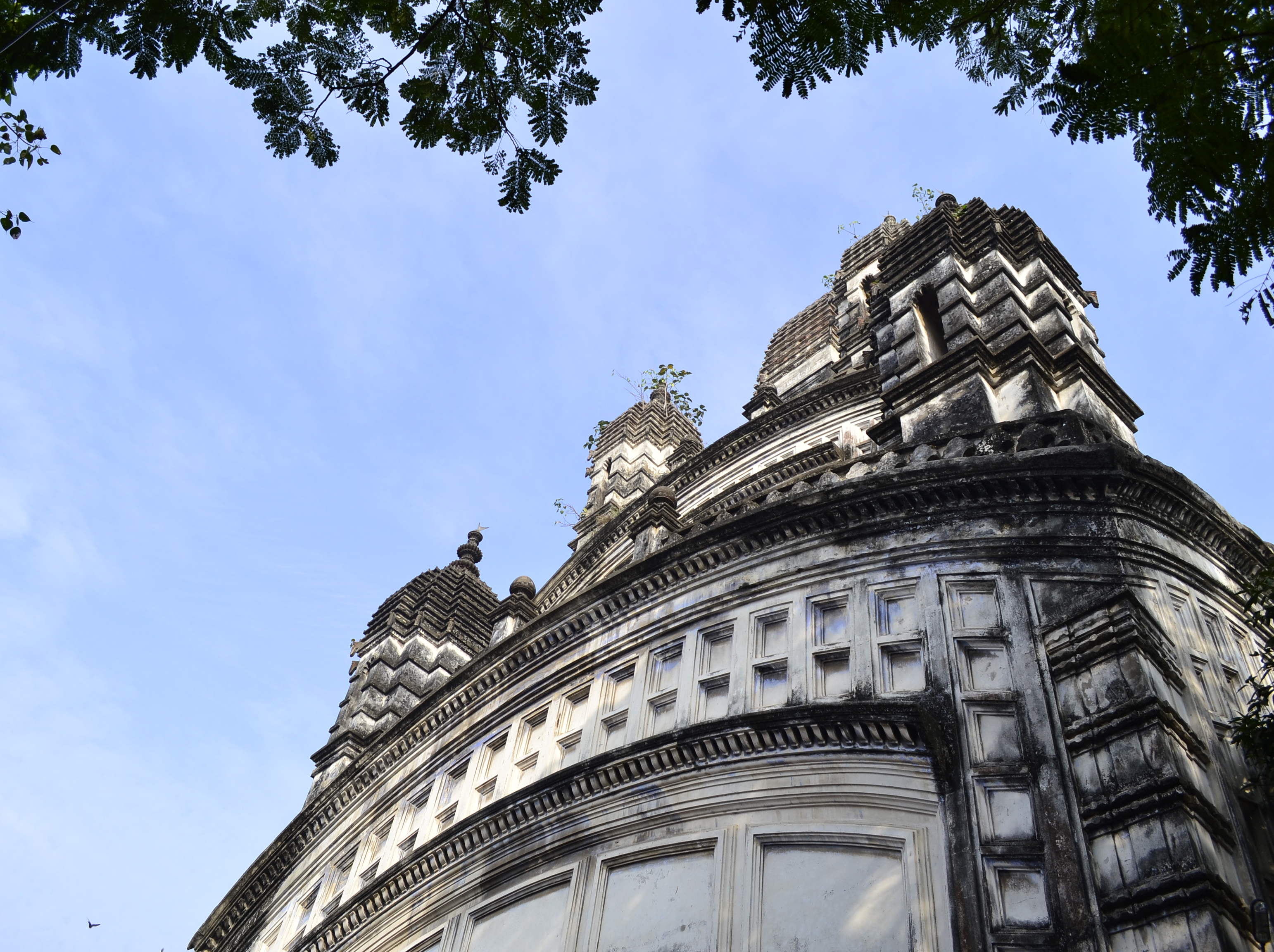
Different angle.

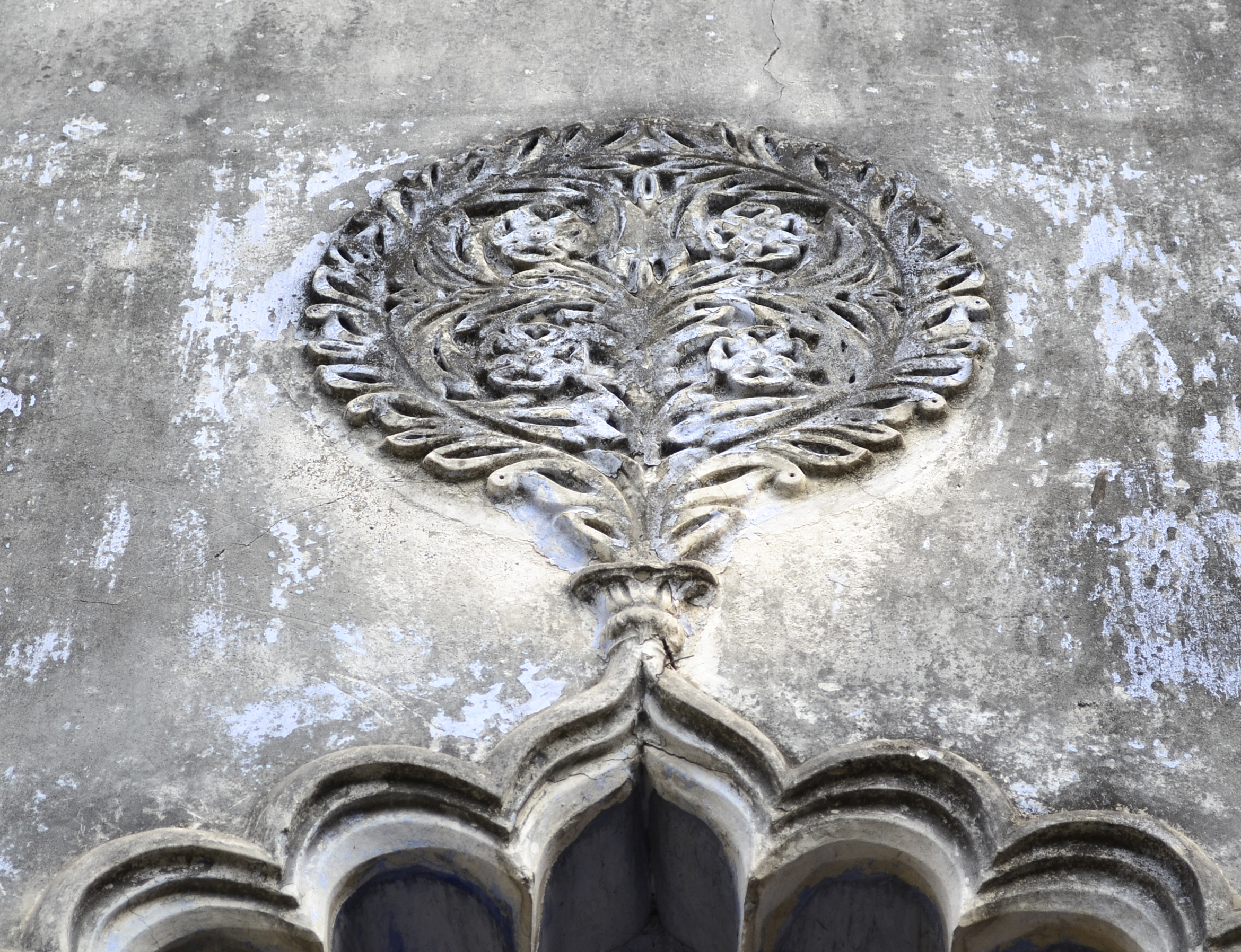
Terracotta works.

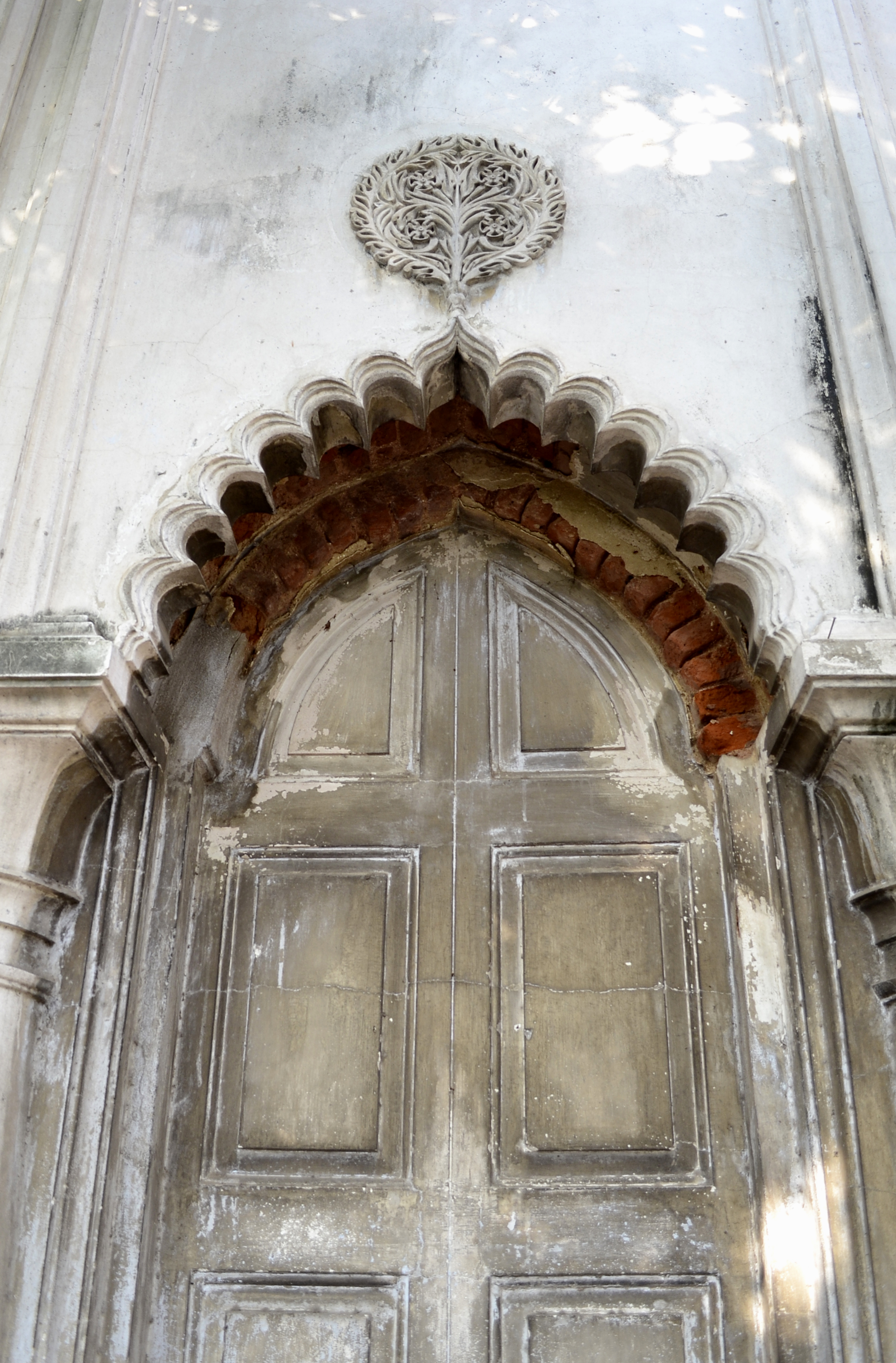
Entrance.

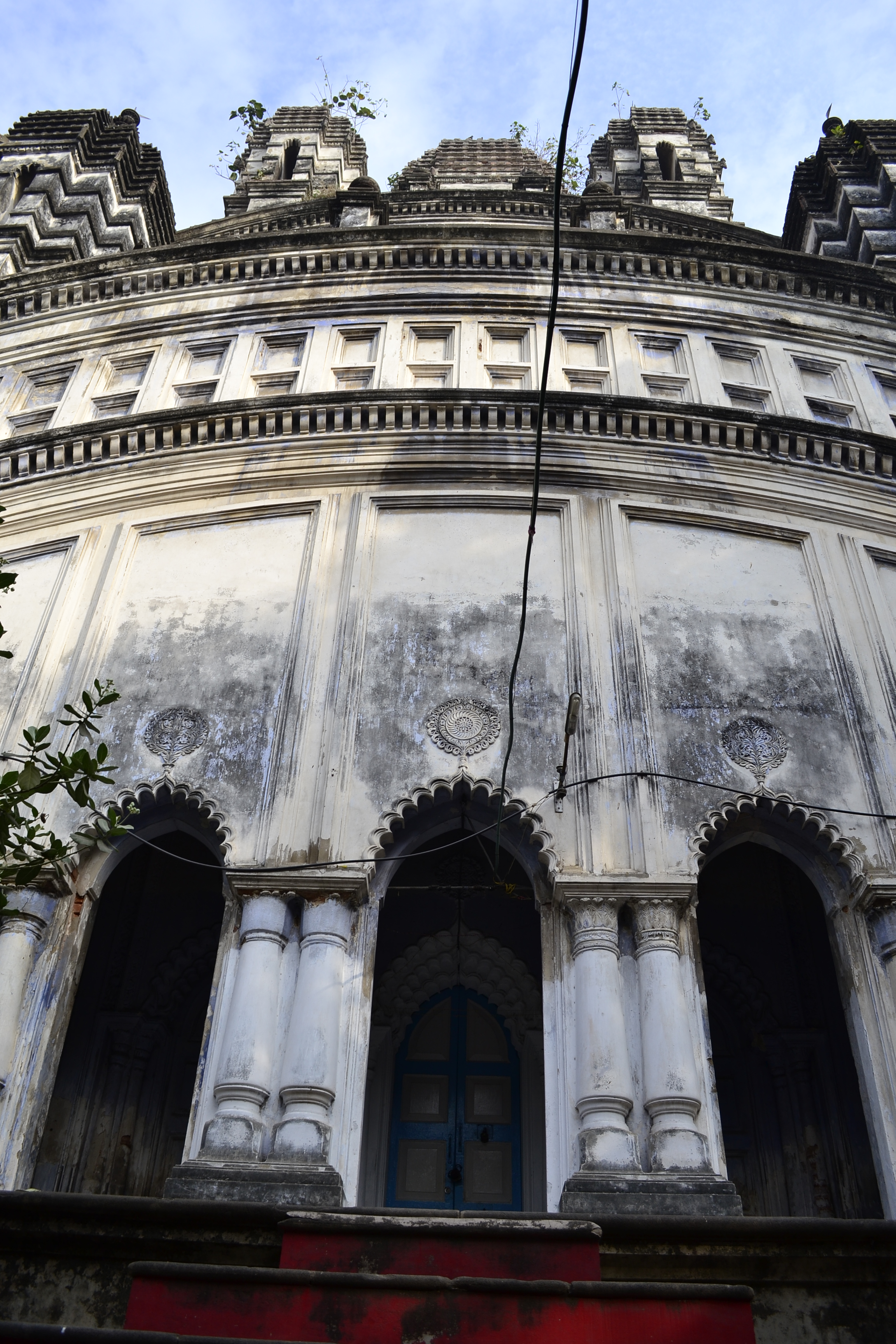
Another angle.

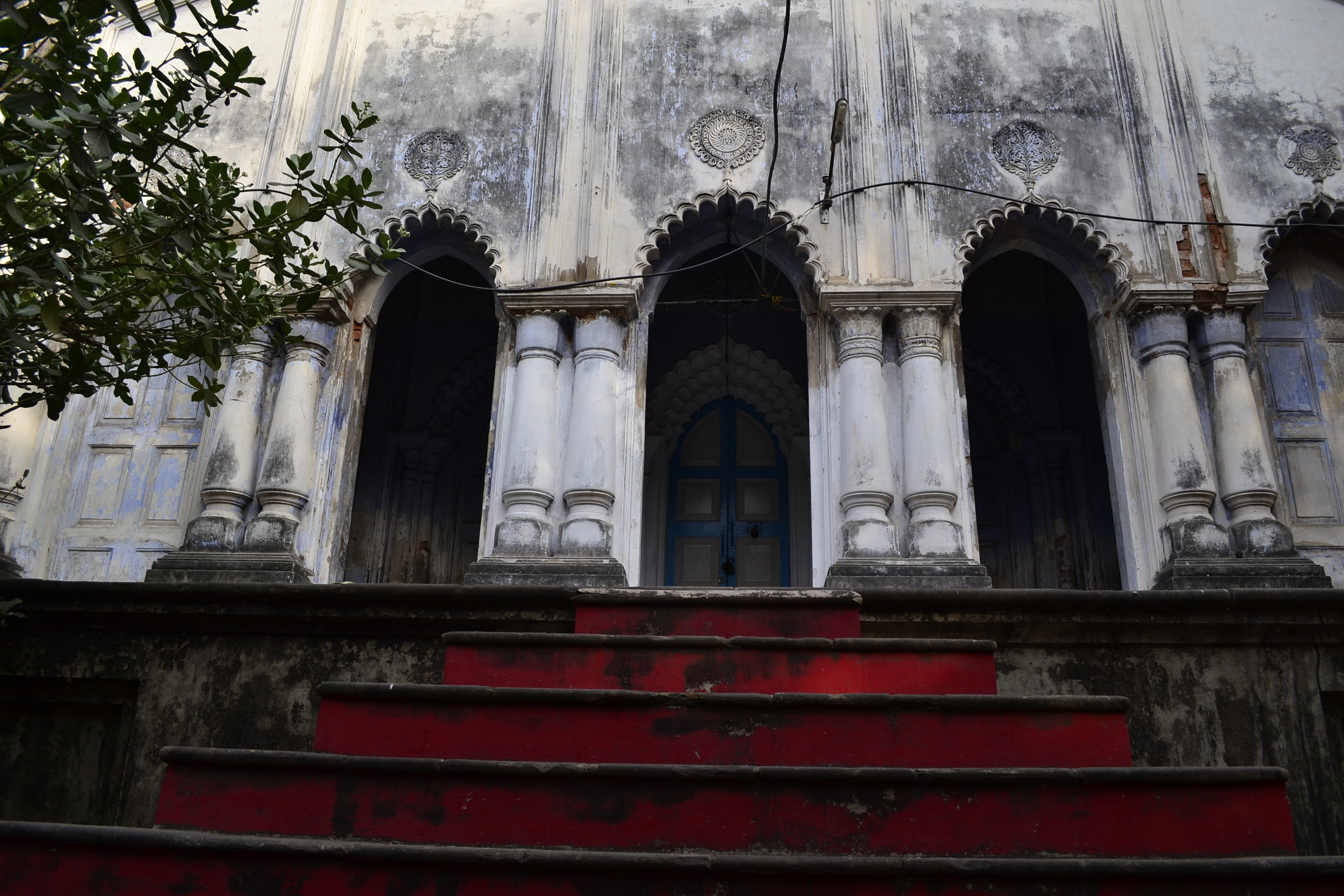
Pillars.

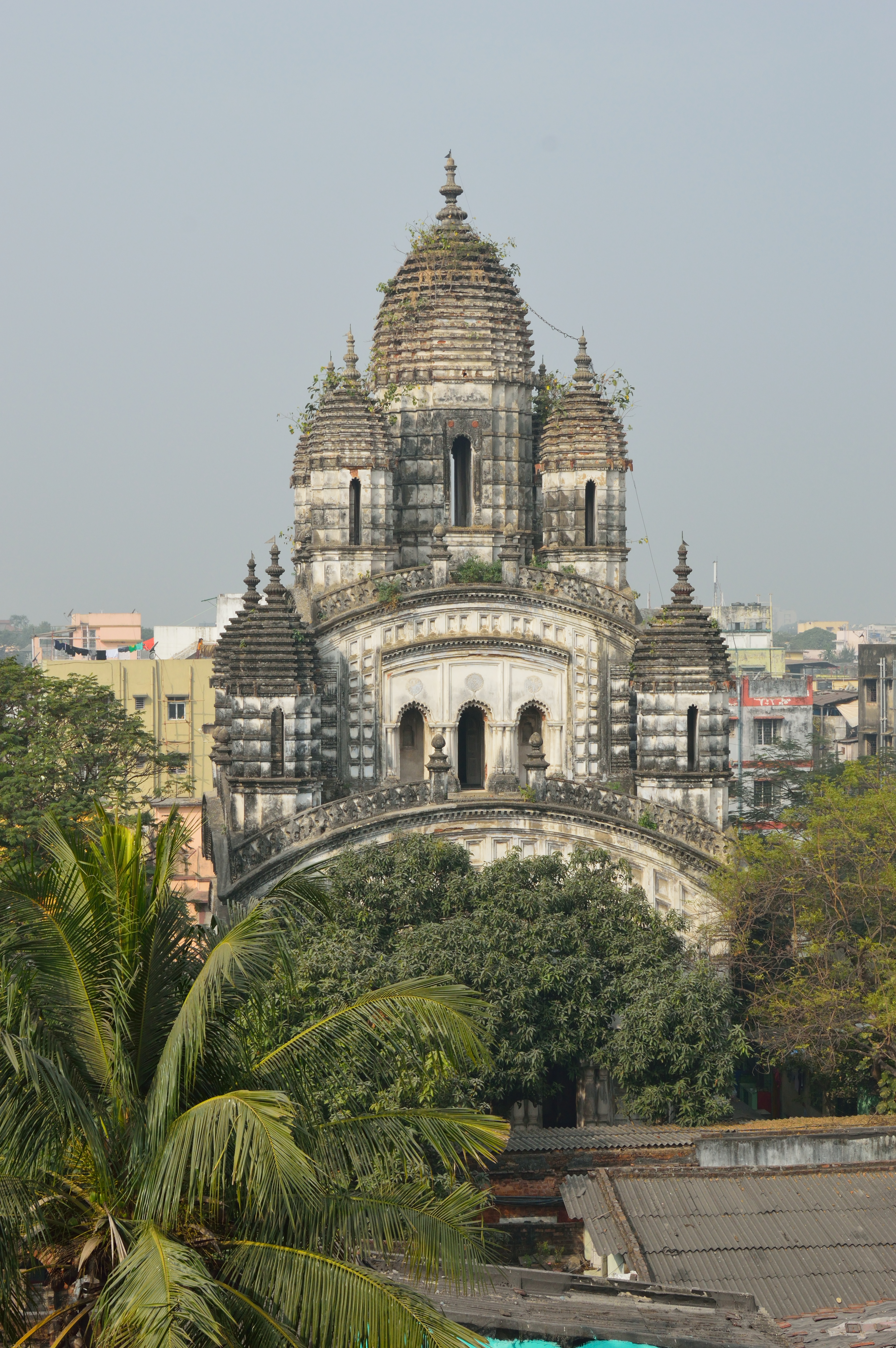
From a neighbour's roof.

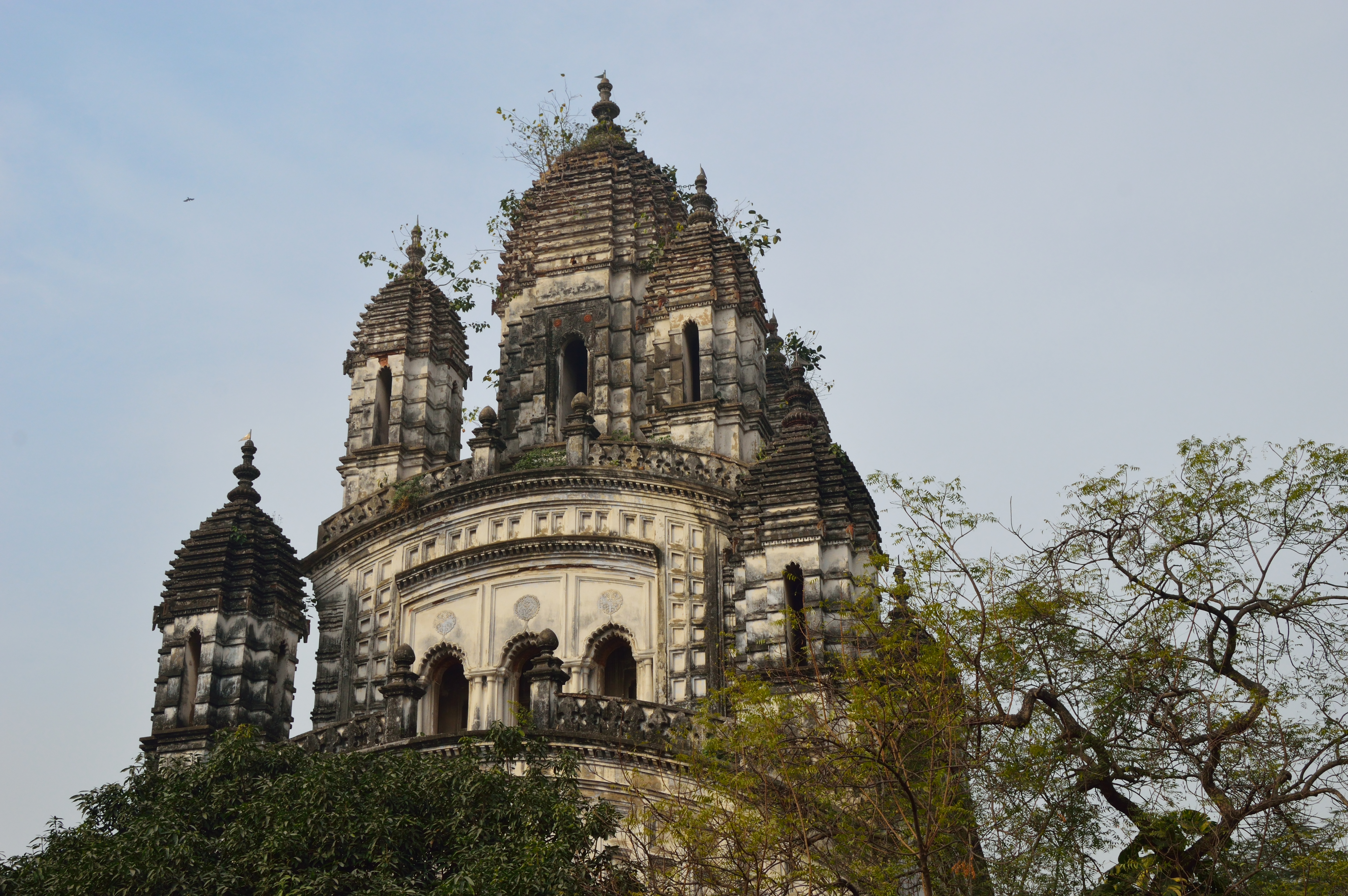
Navaratna Style.

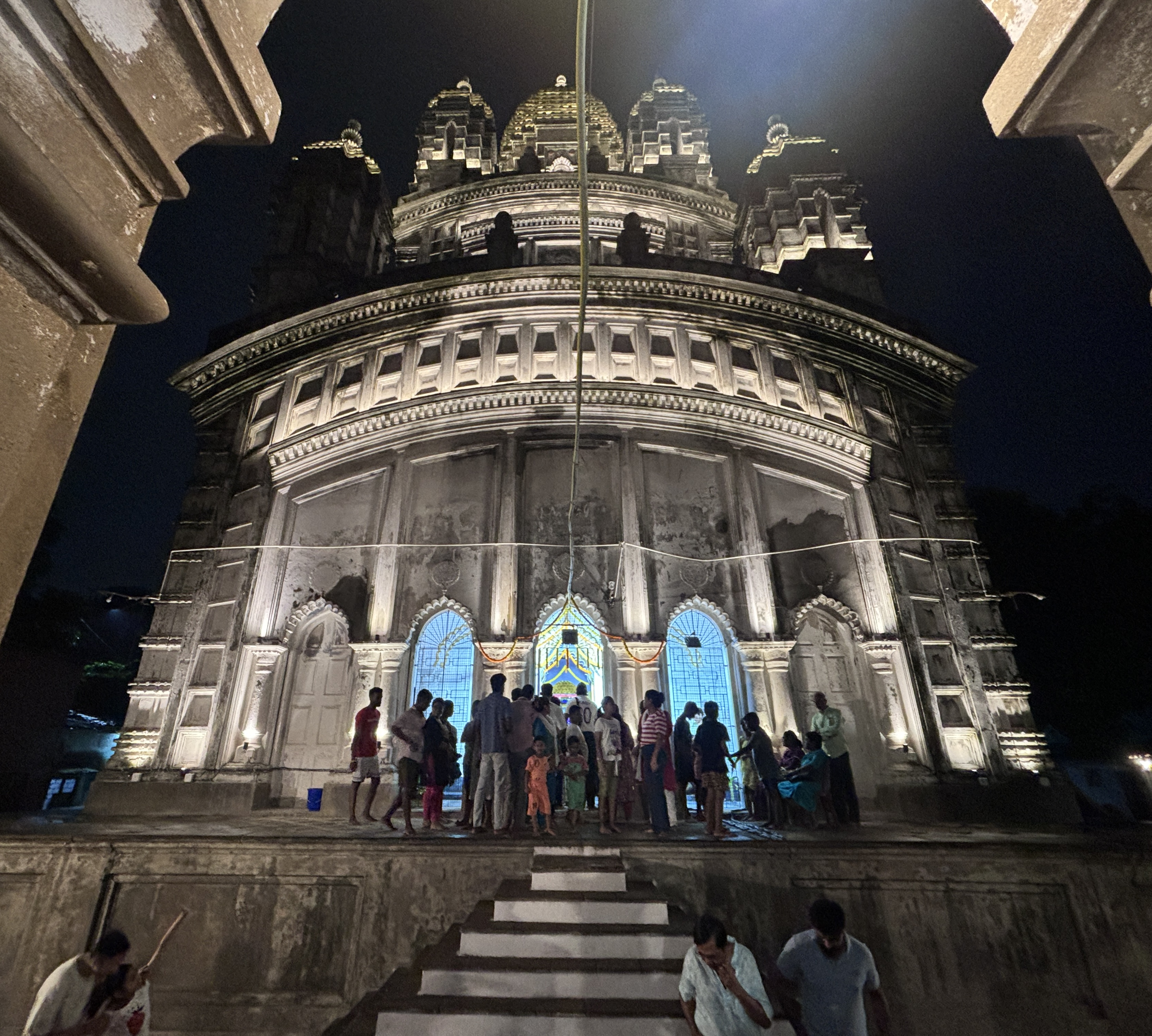
At night during Janmastami

Nat-mandir.

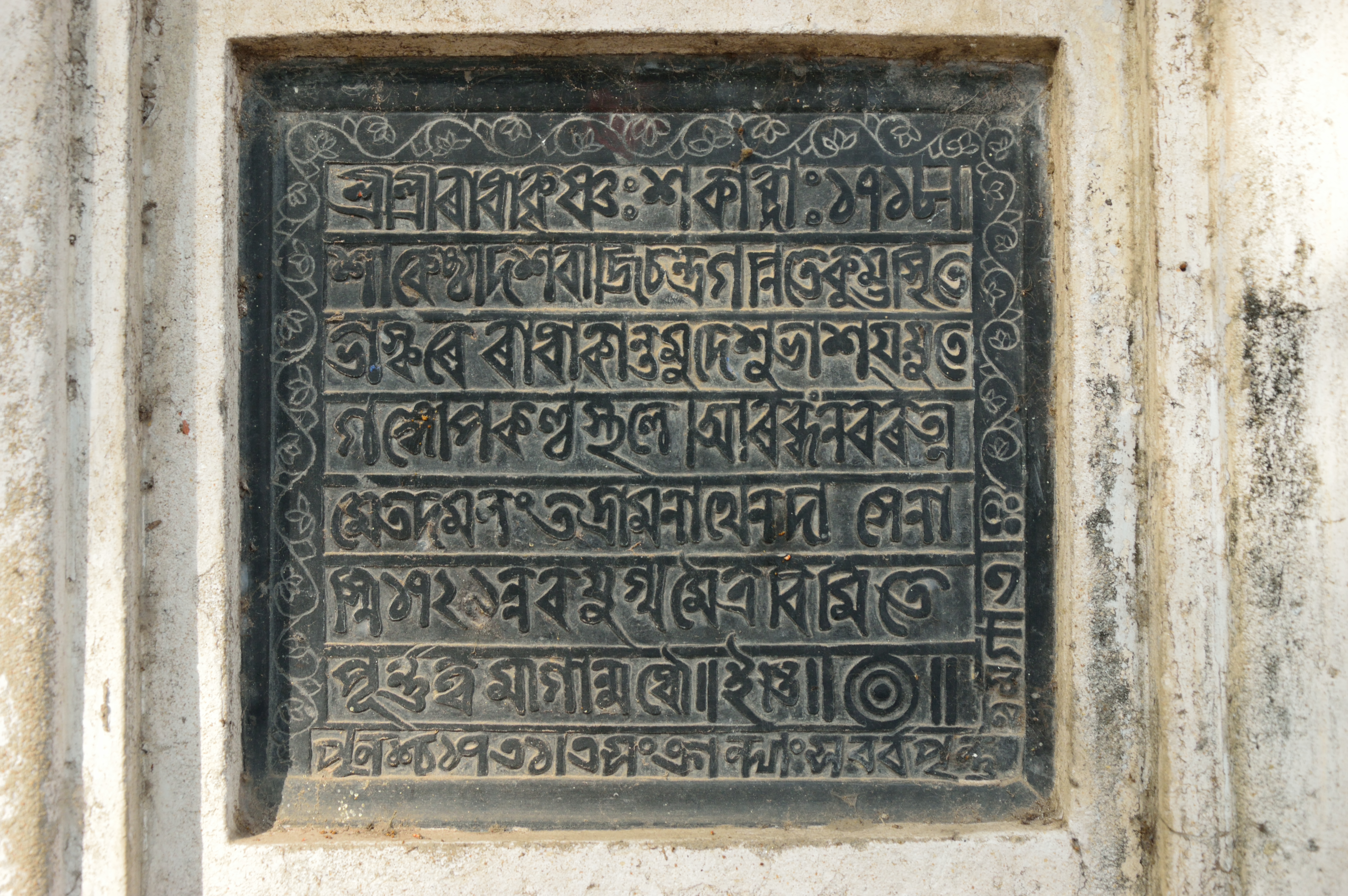
Plaque (closer view).

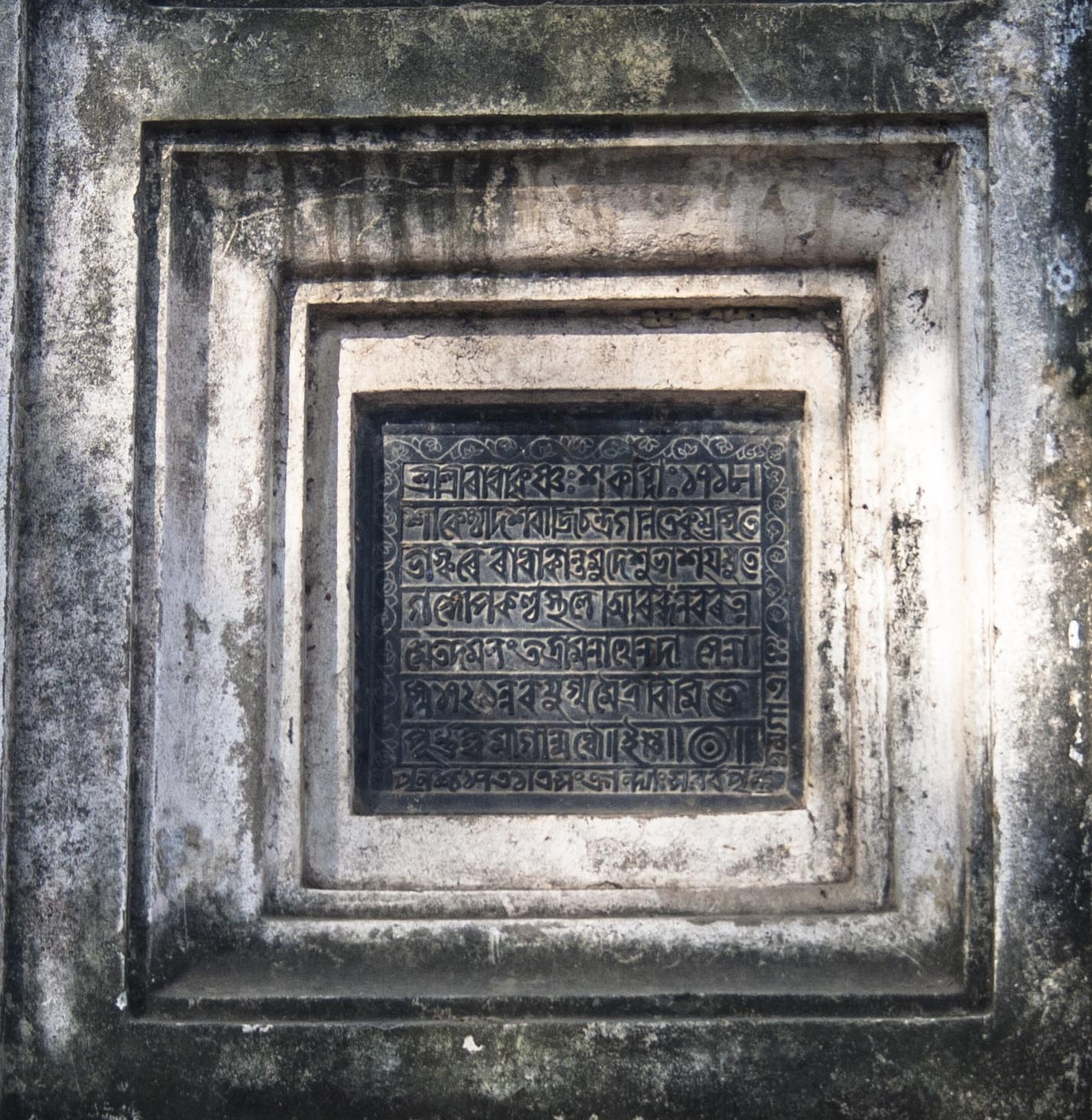
Plaque.

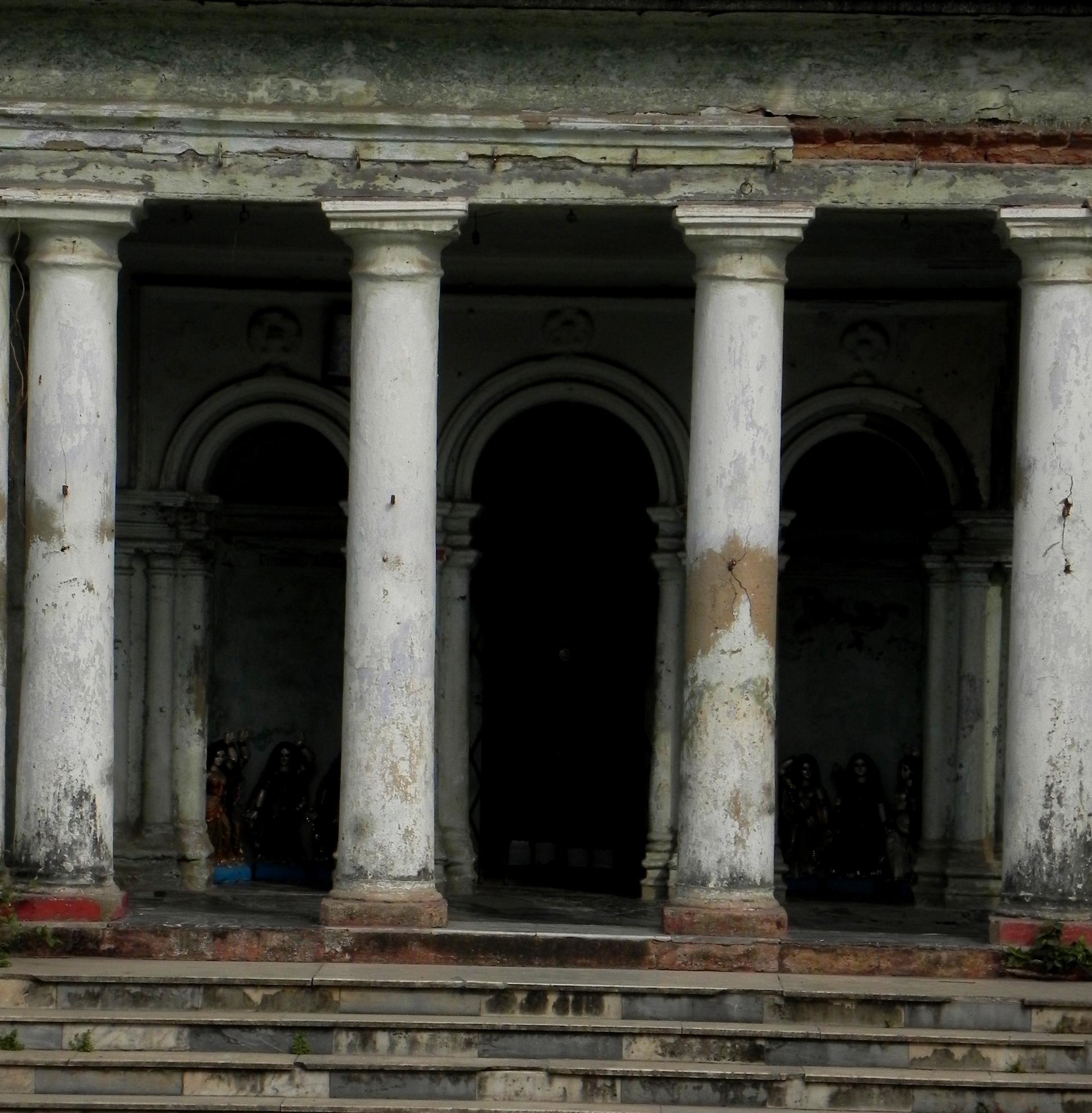
Inside view.

Archaic photograph of the temple, presumably taken during the late 19th-century, by Samuel Bourne.

== See also ==
- Bawali Raj
- Choto Rasbari
