= Dinesh Das =

Indian poet and author

- Born: 16 September 1913; Chetla, Alipore, Calcutta, Bengal, British Indian Empire
- Died: 13 March 1985 (aged 71); Gopalnagar, Chetla, Alipore, Kolkata, West Bengal, India
- Education: South Subarban College, Scottish Church College
- Occupations: Poet, Author, Novelist
- Notable work: Kaste, Ram Gache Banabashe
- Political party: Communist Party of India (Marxist)
- Spouse: Manika Biswas
- Children: 3

Dinesh Das (16 September 1913 – 13 March 1985) was a Bengali poet and Communist activist.

== Early life ==
He was born in his maternal home at Chetla in Alipore, a locality on the bank of Adi Ganga creek in a Mahishya family, to Rishikesh Das and Kattayani Debi. When he was in Class IX, at around 15 years old, he became involved in secret revolutionary Indian independence movement. He also became involved in Mohandas Karamchand Gandhi's Salt Satyagraha movement which hampered his formal education. However, he passed Matriculation Examination in 1930, and I.A. in 1932 from the South Suburban College (now Asutosh College). In 1933, he was admitted to B.A. in Scottish Church College. In 1934, first poem "Sraboney" was published in Desh. However, he could not complete his B.A. due to his revolutionary and literary activities.

== Career ==
In 1935, he took a job at Khayerbari Tea Estate and moved to Kurseong. There he became disillusioned with Gandhism and on return to Calcutta next year, he became inspired by communism and read writings of Karl Marx, Friedrich Engels and Ralph Fox. In 1937, he created a stir with his poem Kaste (Sickle). He immortalized Kolkata's Clive Street in one of his poems:

Here, in a hundred snake-like veins,
Streams of people come and go.
Through these shrunken veins the blood,
Of the country must flow.
O Mighty City's beating heart,
O Clive Street of Bengal,
A thousand dumb veins freeze to make,
The cornerstone of your high hall.

== Works ==
- Kabita (Poems)
- Bhukhmichhil (Hunger Procession)
- Kancher Manush (Glass Humans)
- Ram gechhe Banabase (Ram is in Forest Exile)
- Kaste (Scythe; also, part of the symbol of the Communist Party): an allegory on modern industrial life

== Awards ==
Dinesh Das's first best collection of poems, 'Ultorath', published in 1959, was awarded a prize. In 1980, he received the first Nazrul Puraskar from Nazrul Academy. In 1982, Dinesh Das was honored with the Rabindra Puraskar for his last collection of poems, 'Ram Gache Banobashe'.

== Personal life ==
In 1939, he married Ms. Manika Biswas, the third daughter of Rai Saheb Jamini Ranjan Biswas, a high-ranking government employee from Dhaka. He was the father of two sons Shantanu and Bhairab and one daughter, Jonaki.
