= Chetla =

- Neighbourhood in Kolkata (Calcutta)
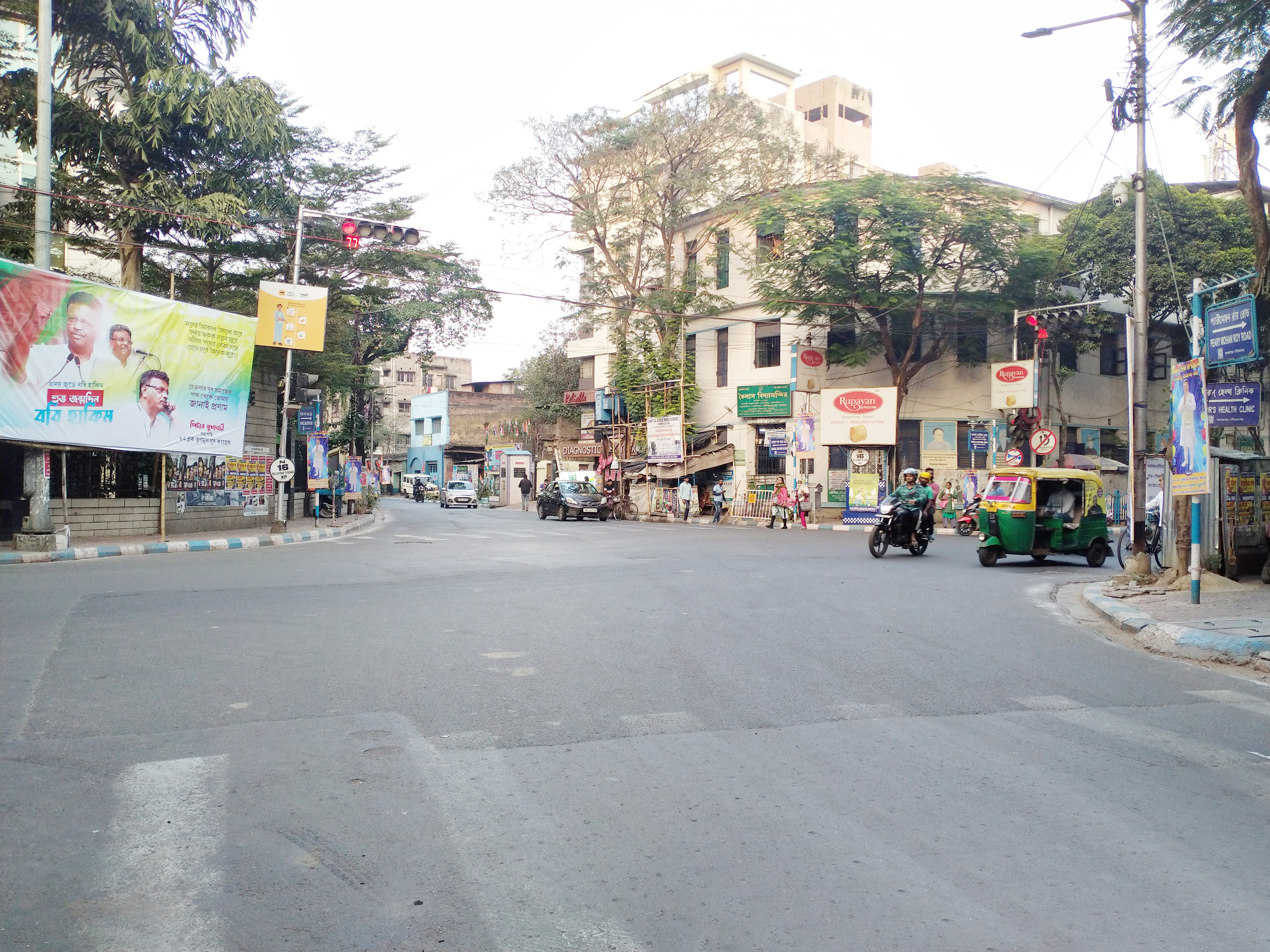

- Location in Kolkata
- Coordinates: 22.518345°N 88.337611°E
- Country: India
- State: West Bengal
- City: Kolkata
- District: Kolkata
- Metro Station: Kalighat and Majerhat
- Municipal Corporation: Kolkata Municipal Corporation
- KMC ward: 82

Population
  - Total: For population see linked KMC ward page
- Time zone: UTC+5:30 (IST)
- Area code: +91 33
- Lok Sabha constituency: Kolkata Dakshin
- Vidhan Sabha constituency: Bhabanipur

Chetla is a neighbourhood of South Kolkata in Kolkata district in the Indian state of West Bengal.

== Geography ==
=== Police district ===
Chetla police station is part of the South division of Kolkata Police and is located at 19/4 Pitamber Ghatak Lane, Kolkata-700027.

See also – Chetla police station boundary map

Tollygunge Women's police station has jurisdiction over all the police districts in the South Division, i.e. Park Street, Shakespeare Sarani, Alipore, Hastings, Maidan, Bhowanipore, Kalighat, Tollygunge, Charu Market, New Alipur and Chetla.

== Culture ==
The renovated Nabaratna temple of the Bawali Raj family of Chetla is the largest and most important temple of this type in south Kolkata.

== Notable people ==
- Dinesh Das, Indian poet, author and writer, Marxist activist, won the Rabindra Puraskar

== Transport ==
Several buses ply on Chetla Central Road.

Bus routes

- 3B (Milk Colony - New Alipore)
- S-22 (Shakuntala Park - Karunamoyee)
- S-46 (Rabindra Nagar - Karunamoyee)
- SD76 (Amtala - Ruby Hospital)
- M-14 (Behala 14 no - New Town)
- S-62 (Ramnagar - Patuli)
