= Adi Ganga =

Stream in West Bengal, India

Adi Ganga Gobindapur Creek, Tolly's Canal
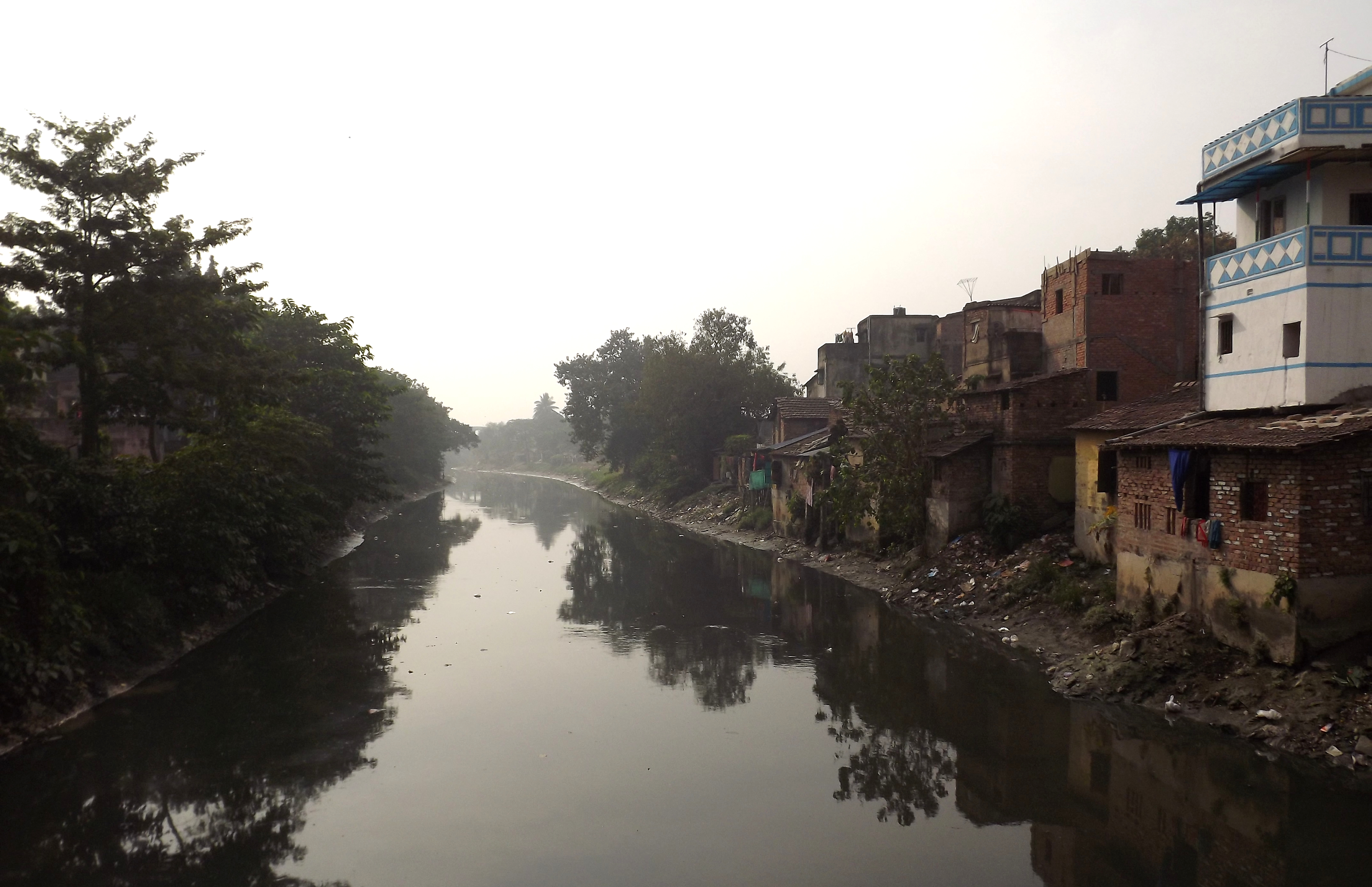

Location
- Country: India
- State: West Bengal

Physical characteristics
- Source: Sundarbans
  - coordinates: 22.550571°N 88.324703°E
- Mouth: Bay of Bengal
  - coordinates: 21°34′00″N 88°21′31″E

Basin features
- River system: Hooghly River
- Cities: Kolkata

Adi Ganga (also known as the Gobindapur Creek and Tolly's Canal) is a stream that was part of the Hooghly River in the Kolkata area of India. It was the main flow of the Hooghly River from the 15th to 17th centuries, but it eventually dried up due to natural causes.

== History ==
In the 18th century, the British colonial government in India commissioned the excavation of Tolly's Canal by reviving part of the old route of the Adi Ganga. This was done to create a more direct and practical route for oceangoing ships, as the existing route was circuitous and impractical for the movement of country boats during the monsoon season.

The excavation of Tolly's Canal had significant ecological and social costs, as it led to the degradation of the Adi Ganga and the loss of the ghats (steps leading down to a body of water) and other cultural landmarks that had been established along its banks.

In the 1960s, the water route lost its vitality and the canal transformed into a drain due to the dumping of untreated industrial and domestic waste into it.

Today, the Adi Ganga is heavily polluted and is a source of environmental and public health concerns for the surrounding communities.
