= Niranjan Sengupta =

Bengali revolutionary (1904–1969)

- নিরঞ্জন সেনগুপ্ত
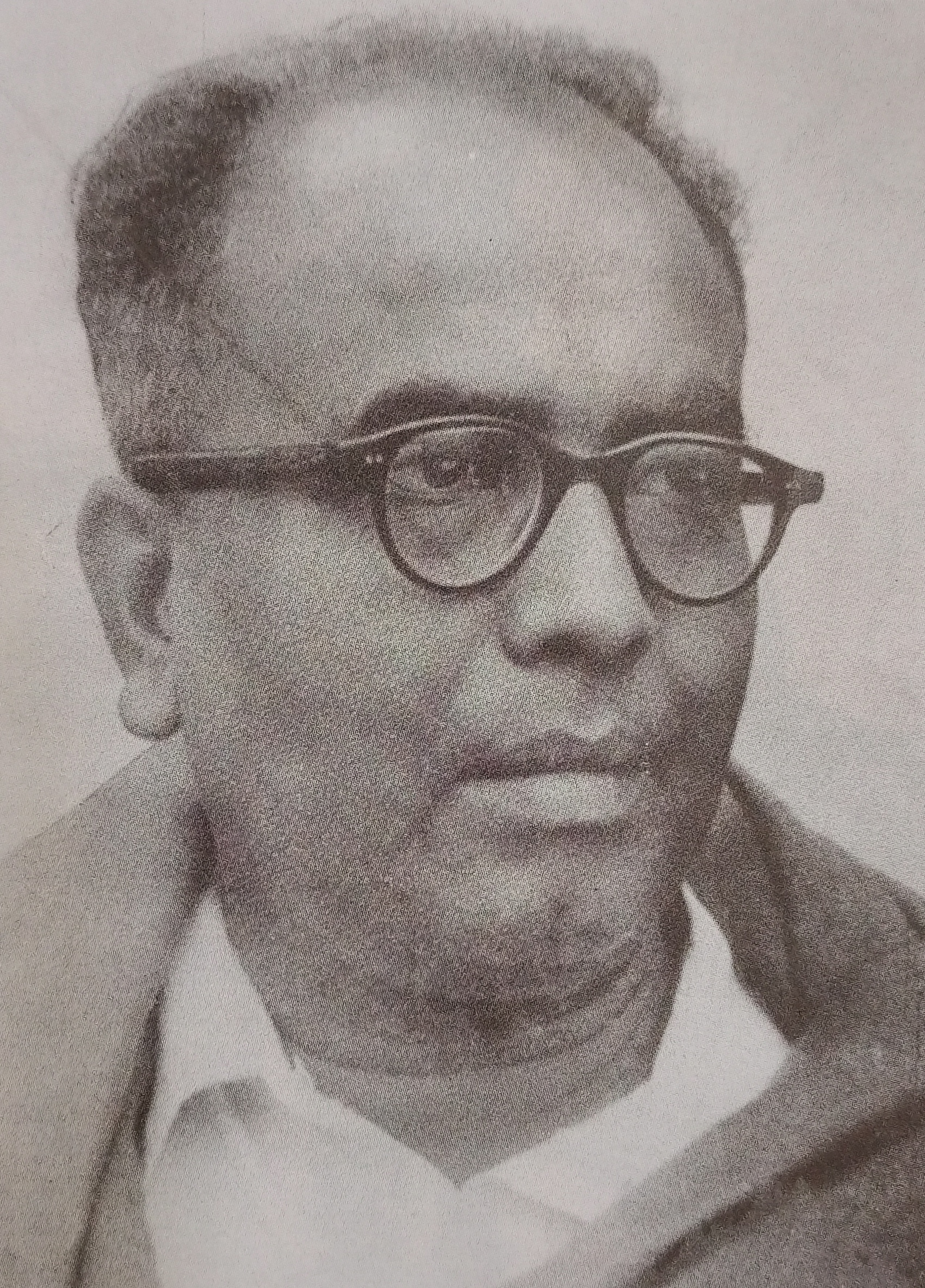
- A veteran Niranjan Sengupta. Probably 1968-69

Member of West Bengal Legislative Assembly
- In office 1957–1962
- Constituency: Bijpur

Member of West Bengal Legislative Assembly
- In office 1962–1967; 1967–1968; 1969
- Constituency: Tollygunge

Minister of Refugee, Relief and Rehabilitation and Jails, Government of West Bengal
- In office 1967–1968; 1969

Personal details
- Born: 26 July 1904 Barishal, Bengal Presidency, British India
- Died: 4 September 1969 (aged 65) Calcutta, West Bengal, India
- Citizenship: India
- Party: CPI (1938–1964); CPI(M) (1964–1969)

Niranjan Sengupta(26 July 1904 – 4 September 1969) was a Bengali Indian revolutionary, a freedom fighter, and later on, a leader of the Communist Party of India (Marxist). He associated with the Anushilan Samiti. Born in Barisal district, he became active in the nationalist movement during his student years at Ripon College. He sought to unify various revolutionary groups in Bengal and organized arms procurement efforts from his Mechhuabazar residence. Arrested in a police raid, he was sentenced to seven years of rigorous imprisonment in the Cellular Jail. His incarceration transformed him ideologically, leading him to adopt Marxism and work as a communist activist in post-independence India.

== Early life and education ==
Niranjan Sengupta was born on 26 July 1904, in Narayanpur Village of Bharukathi, under Banaripara Police Station, Jhalakathi District, Barishal Division of undivided Bengal, to Sarbananda Sengupta, a clerk in the Civil Court and Kadambini Sengupta. The couple had eleven children (six sons, five daughters). He was the eldest among his brothers, and including his sisters, he was the second oldest.

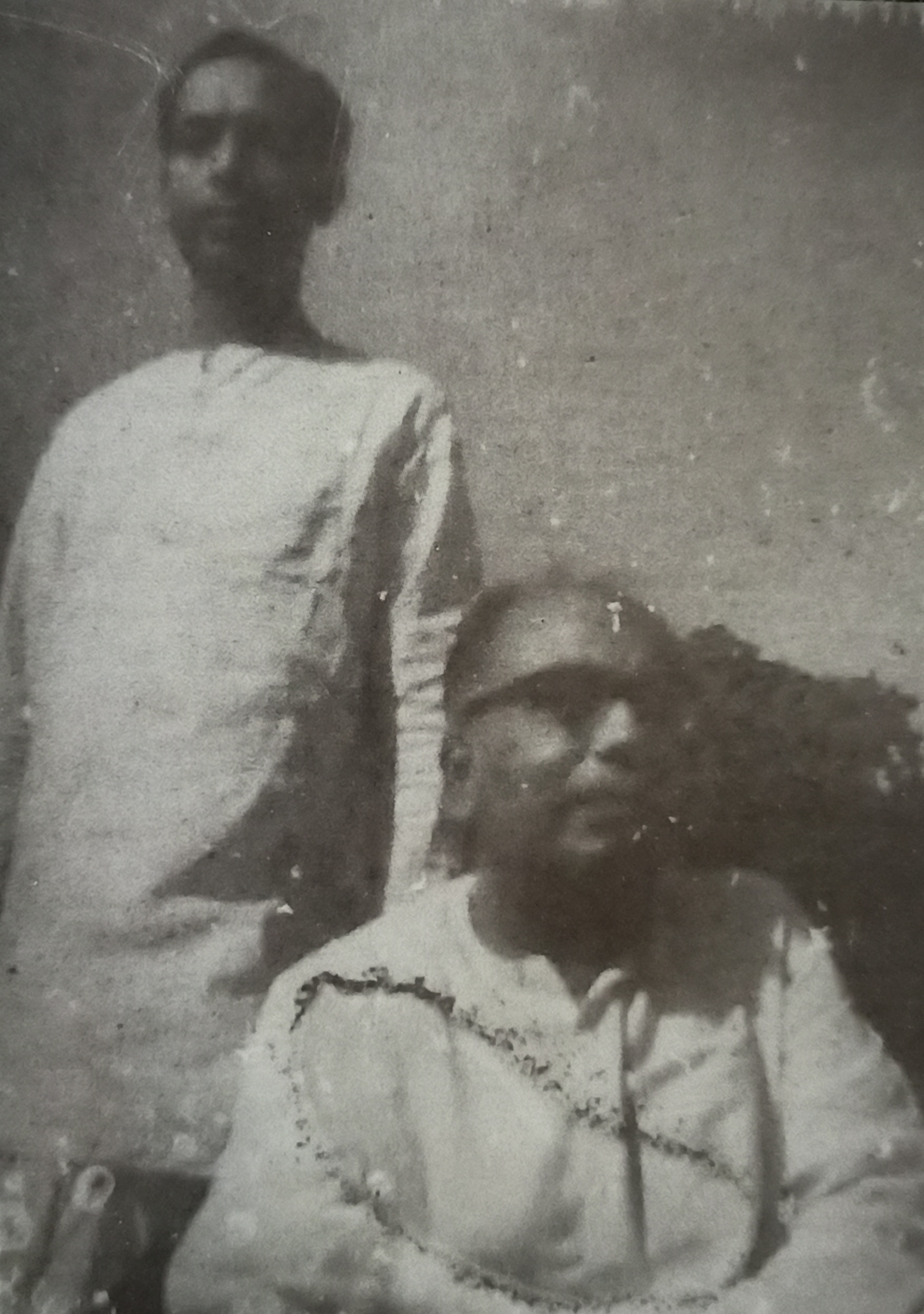
Niranjan Sengupta (seated), with his fifth brother, Sunil Ranjan Sengupta (standing), at their residence in Bansdroni.

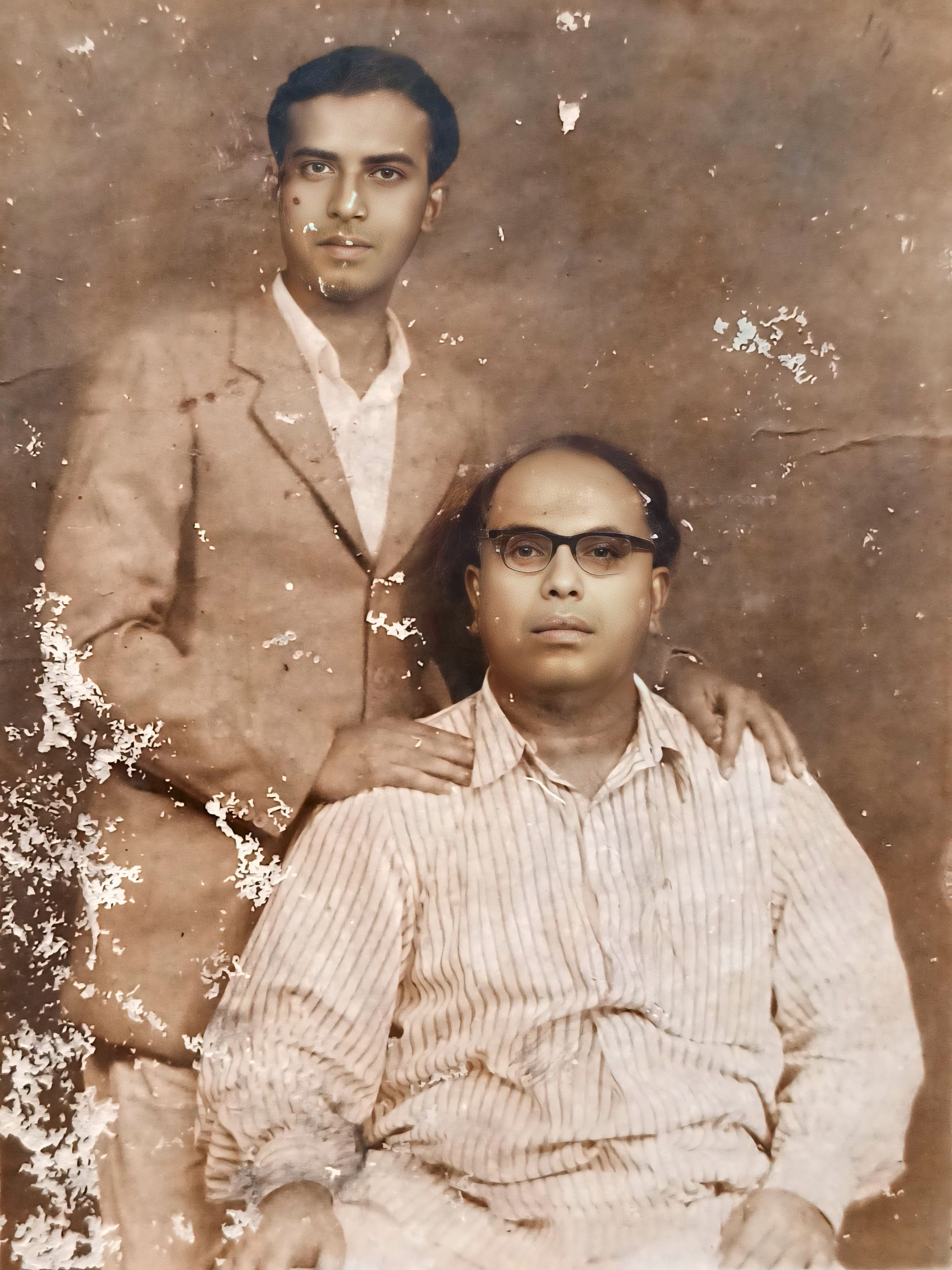
Niranjan Sengupta (seated), with his sixth and youngest brother, Bimal Ranjan Sengupta (standing).

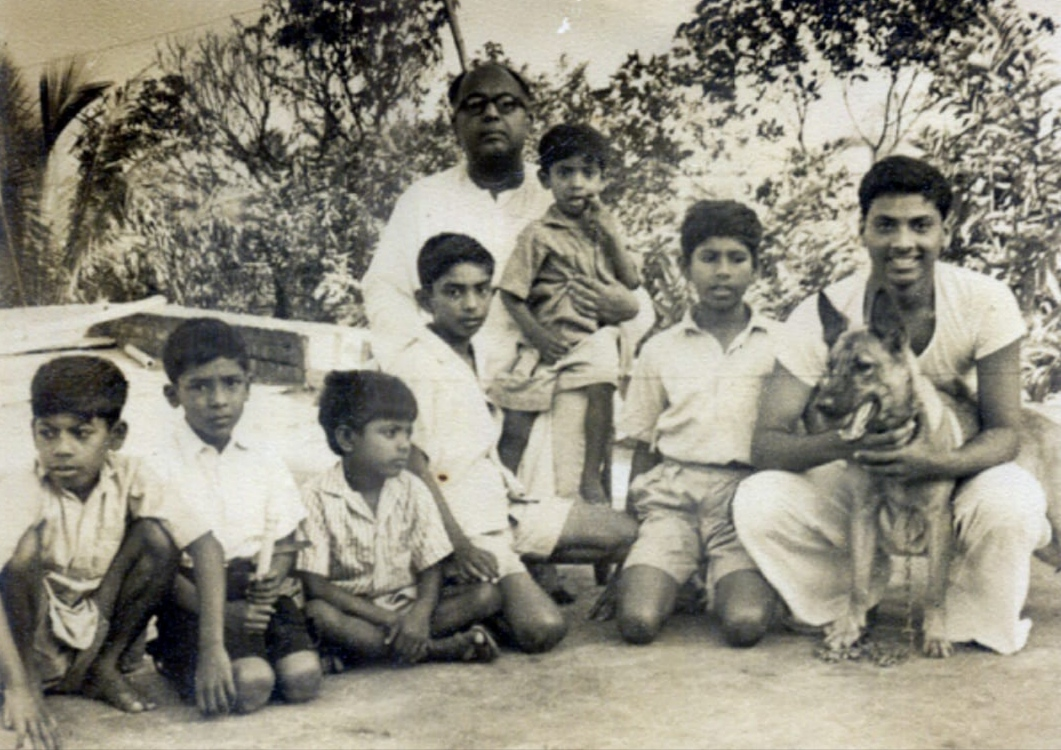
Niranjan Sengupta (seated in the back), with a few of his nephews, and pet dog, Plucky, at their residence in Bansdroni.

Niranjan Sengupta passed his Matriculation with First Division in 1920 from Barishal Zilla School. Thereafter, he moved to Calcutta (now Kolkata) in 1921, and took admission in Ripon College (now Surendranath College) for I.Sc.(Intermediate of Science). After passing his I.Sc. with First Division in 1923, he got admitted to Krishnanath College (now Murshidabad University) to pursue his Bachelor of Science degree, under the order of Anushilan Samiti, which he was an active member of, during his educational days in Calcutta(now Kolkata). On 7 December 1925, the eve of his final year examination, Niranjan Sengupta was arrested for the very first time, at around 2 PM, from his college laboratory, under the Bengal Criminal Law Amendment Act, and was sent to Midnapore Central Jail. He completed his Graduation from prison.

== Personal life ==
Soon after passing his I.Sc.(Intermediate of Science) examination, Niranjan Sengupta was married off to Amiya Sengupta(née Ray), daughter of Chintaharan Ray, Vice Principal of BM College(Government Brojomohun College), Barishal. They were childless.

== Revolutionary activities ==
In 1925, the first elected student's union in India was at Ripon College (now Surendranath College) with Niranjan Sengupta as its president. He was a leader of the Barishal branch of Anushilan Samiti. In 1929, he was one of the leaders who led to the formation of the neo-violence confederation. In 1930, in connection with the Mechuabazar Bomb Case, he was arrested with 23 others. In 1932, he was sent to the Cellular Jail with other revolutionaries where he became acquainted with Communist ideas.

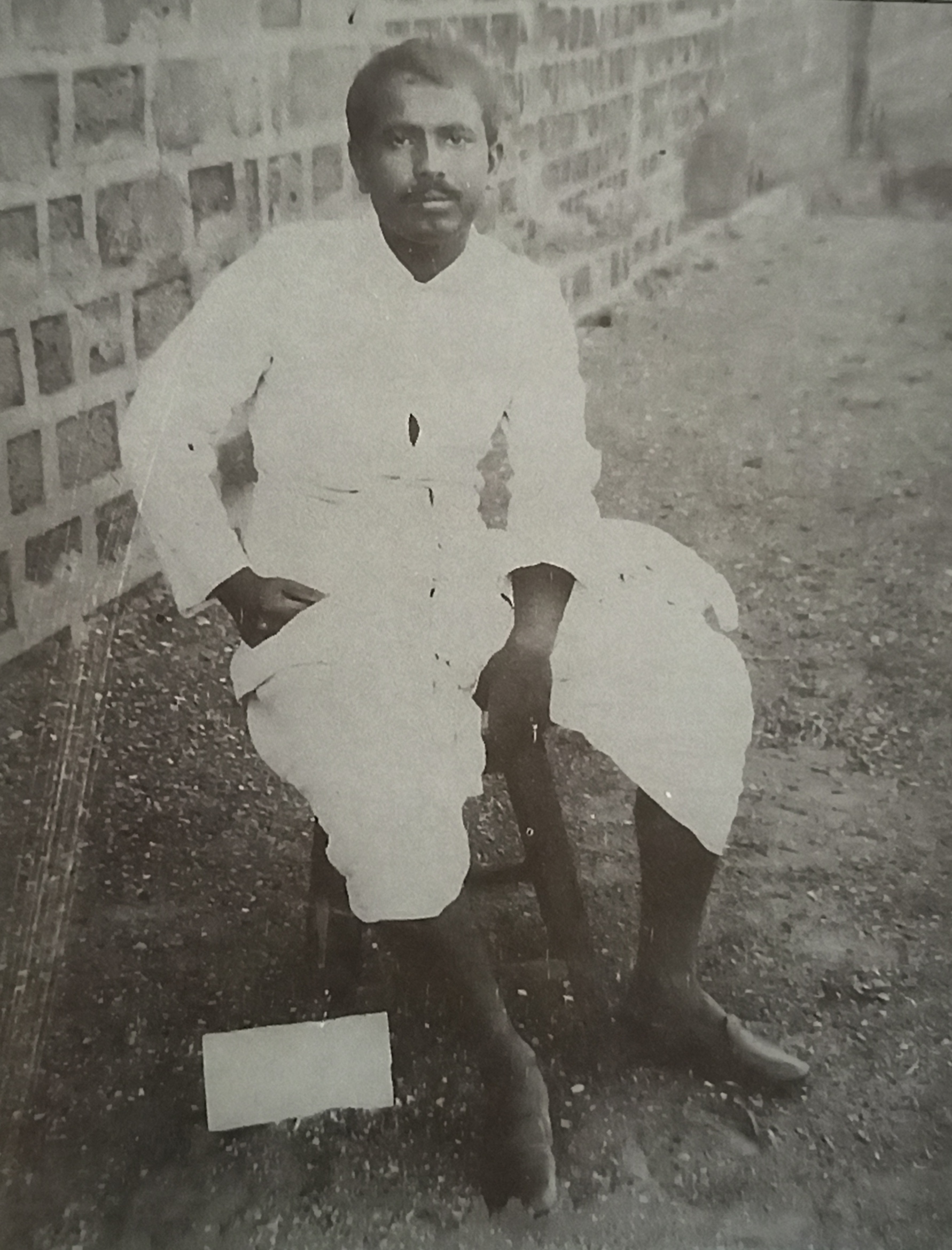
Inside jail premises, after being arrested for the very first time in 1925.

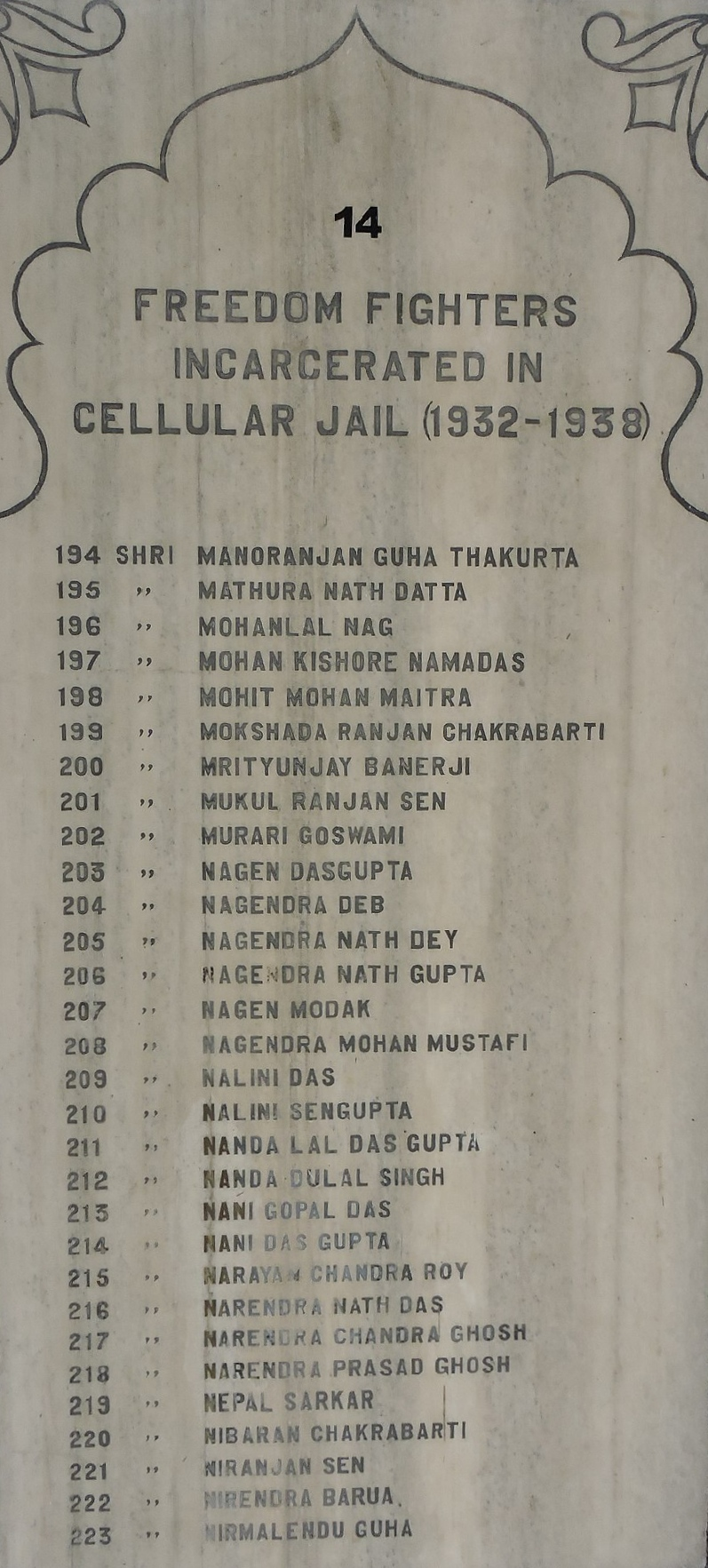
Plaque No. 14 showing a list of freedom fighters incarcerated in Cellular Jail (1932 - 1938). Niranjan Sengupta's name is numbered 221.

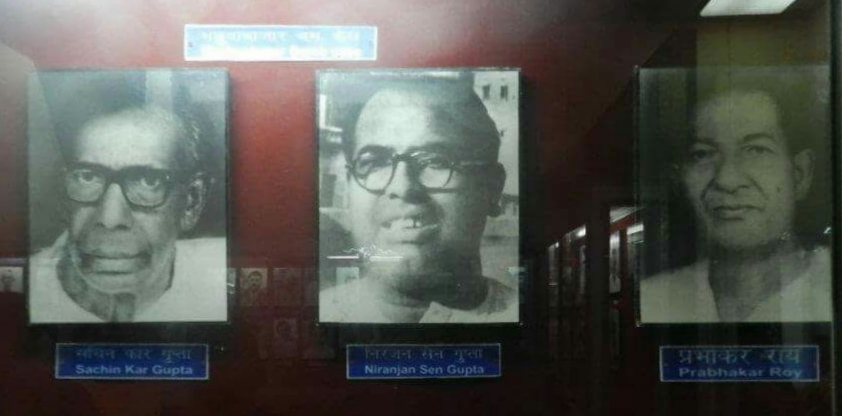
Niranjan Sengupta (middle) in the Prisoners' Photo Gallery of Cellular Jail.

== Politics ==
Later, Niranjan Sengupta became a Marxist and joined the Communist Party of India in 1938. He was one of the seven members of an inner committee set up by the Politburo of the Communist Party of India. He also had important role during the inner-party struggle of this communist party. He was elected as a member of Legislative Assembly of West Bengal in 1957 election from Bijpur. After the split in the Communist Party of India, Niranjan Sengupta remained with the Communist Party of India (Marxist). He was also a minister in the coalition ministry of West Bengal in 1967 – 1968 and 1969.

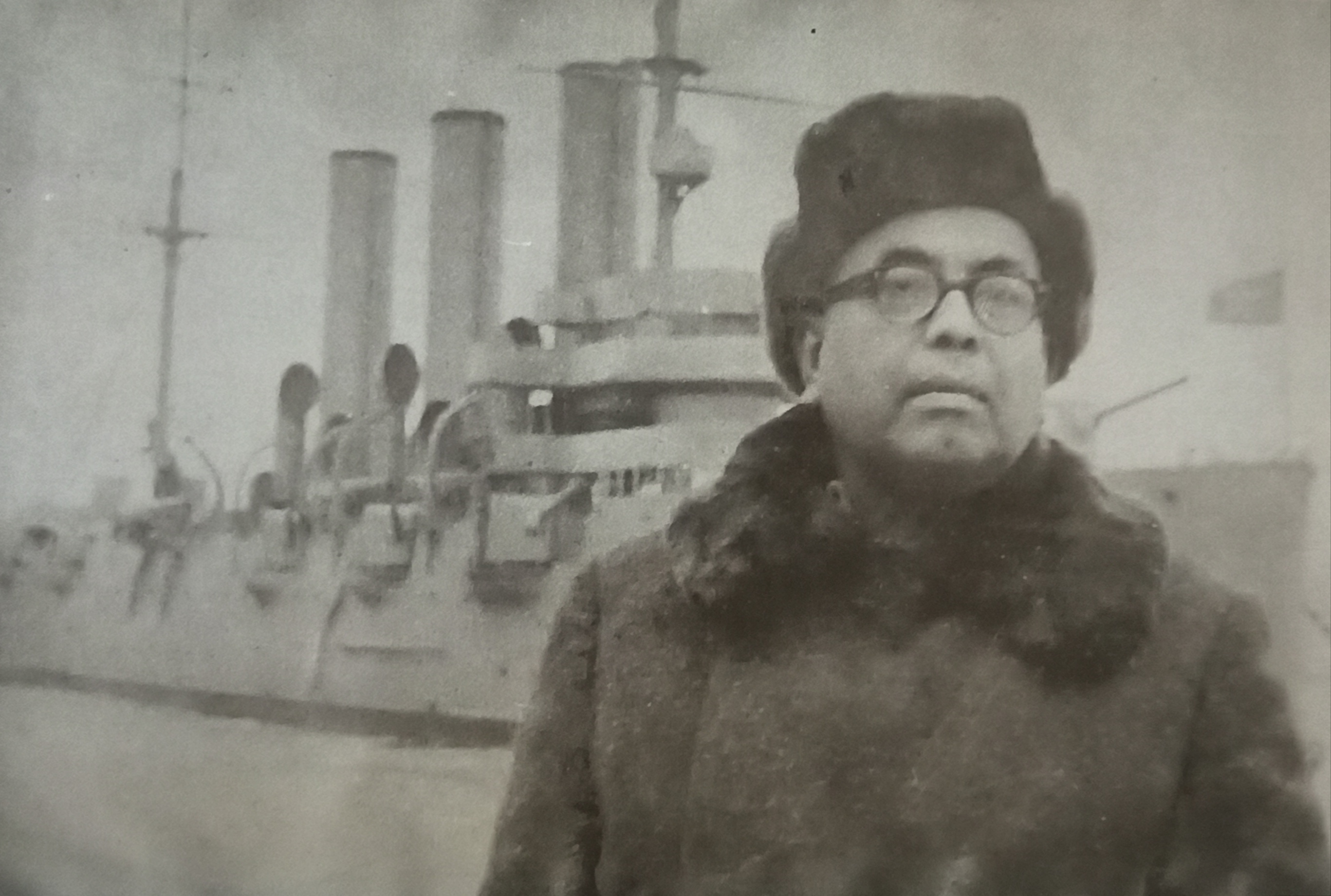
Niranjan Sengupta at the Leningrad Museum with Russian cruiser Aurora in the background.

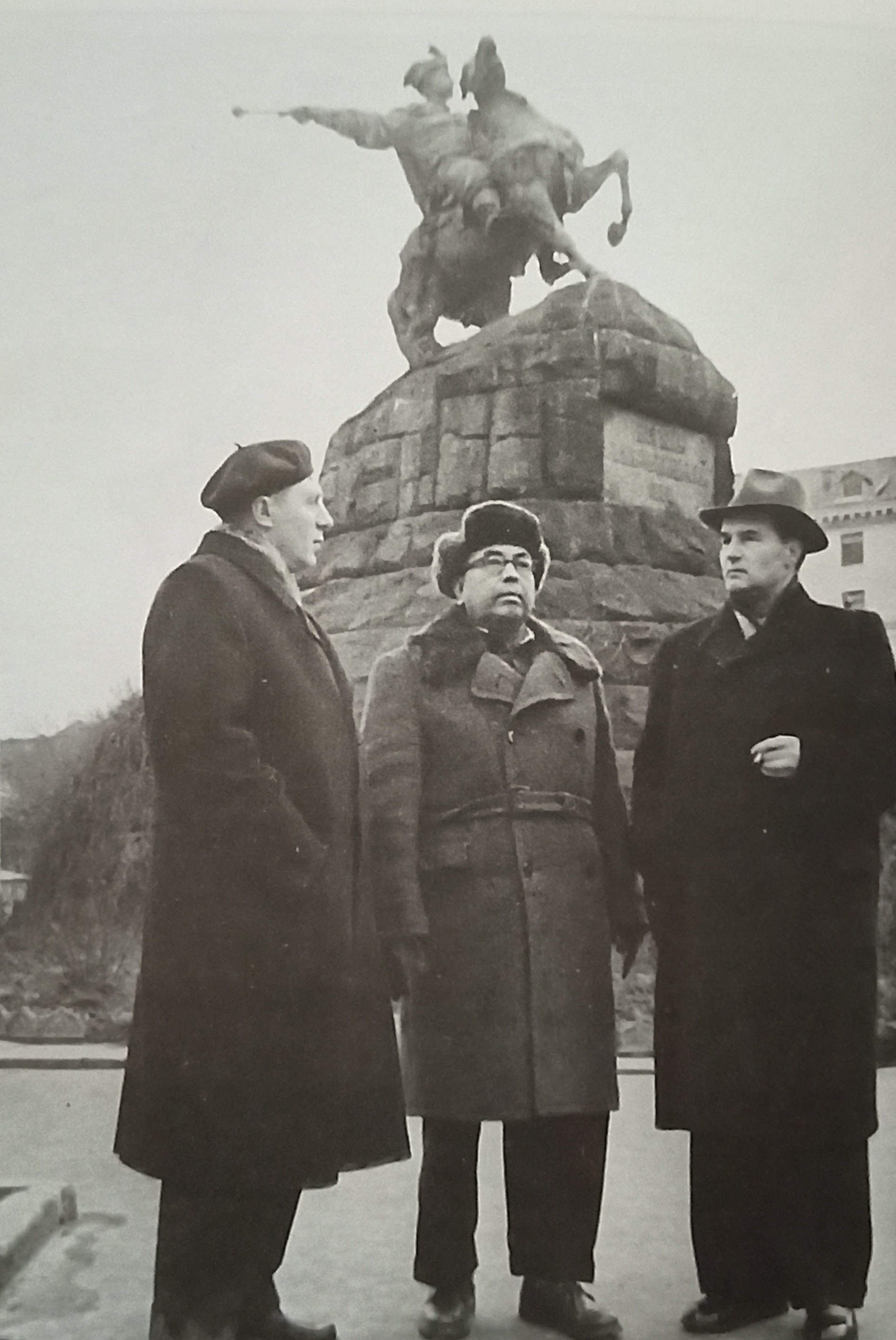
Niranjan Sengupta (middle) in front of a Bohdan Khmelnytsky Monument, Kyiv.

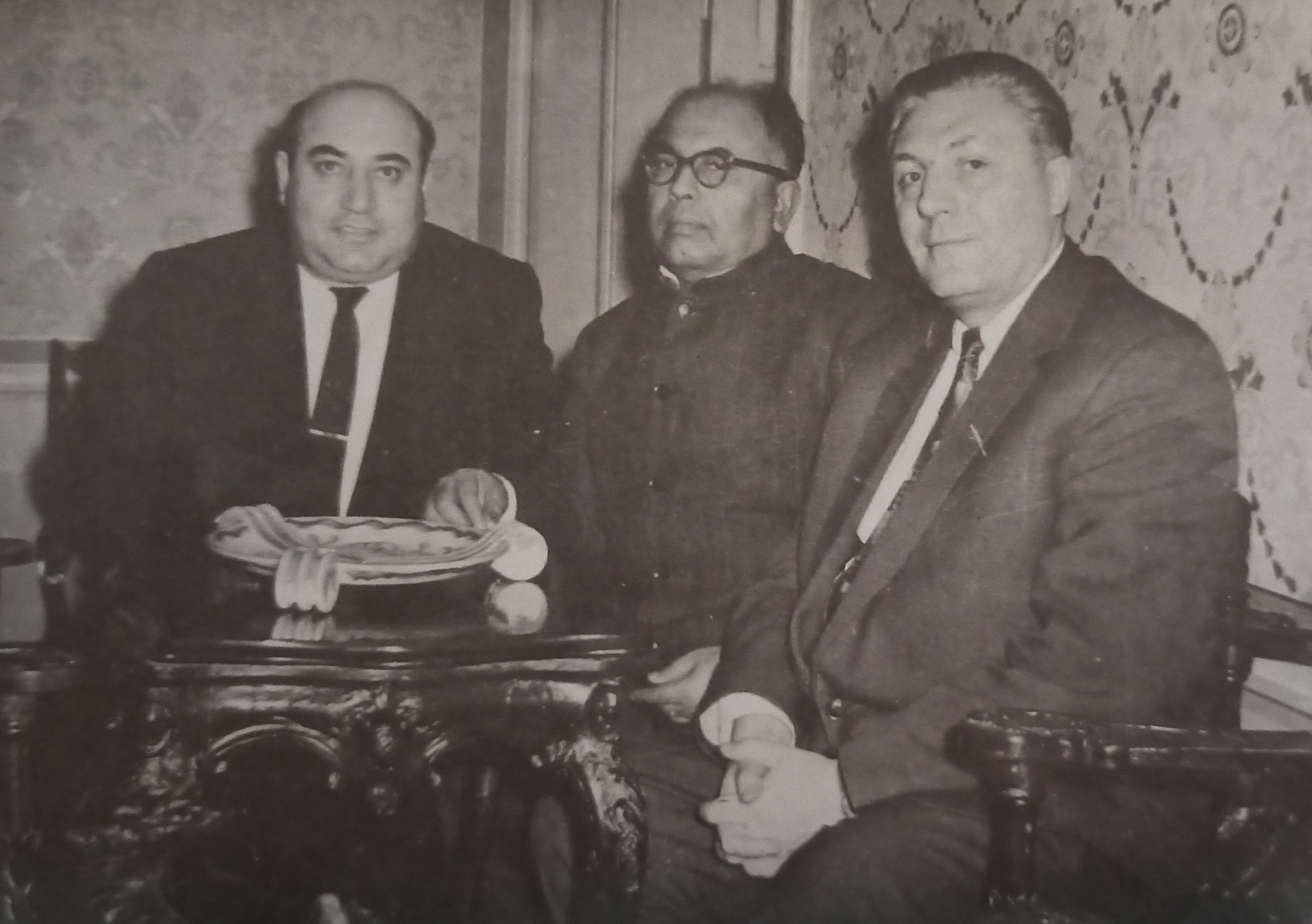
Niranjan Sengupta (middle) at Moscow with the secretary of Moscow City Committee of the Communist Party of the Soviet Union (to his right) and interpreter (to his left).

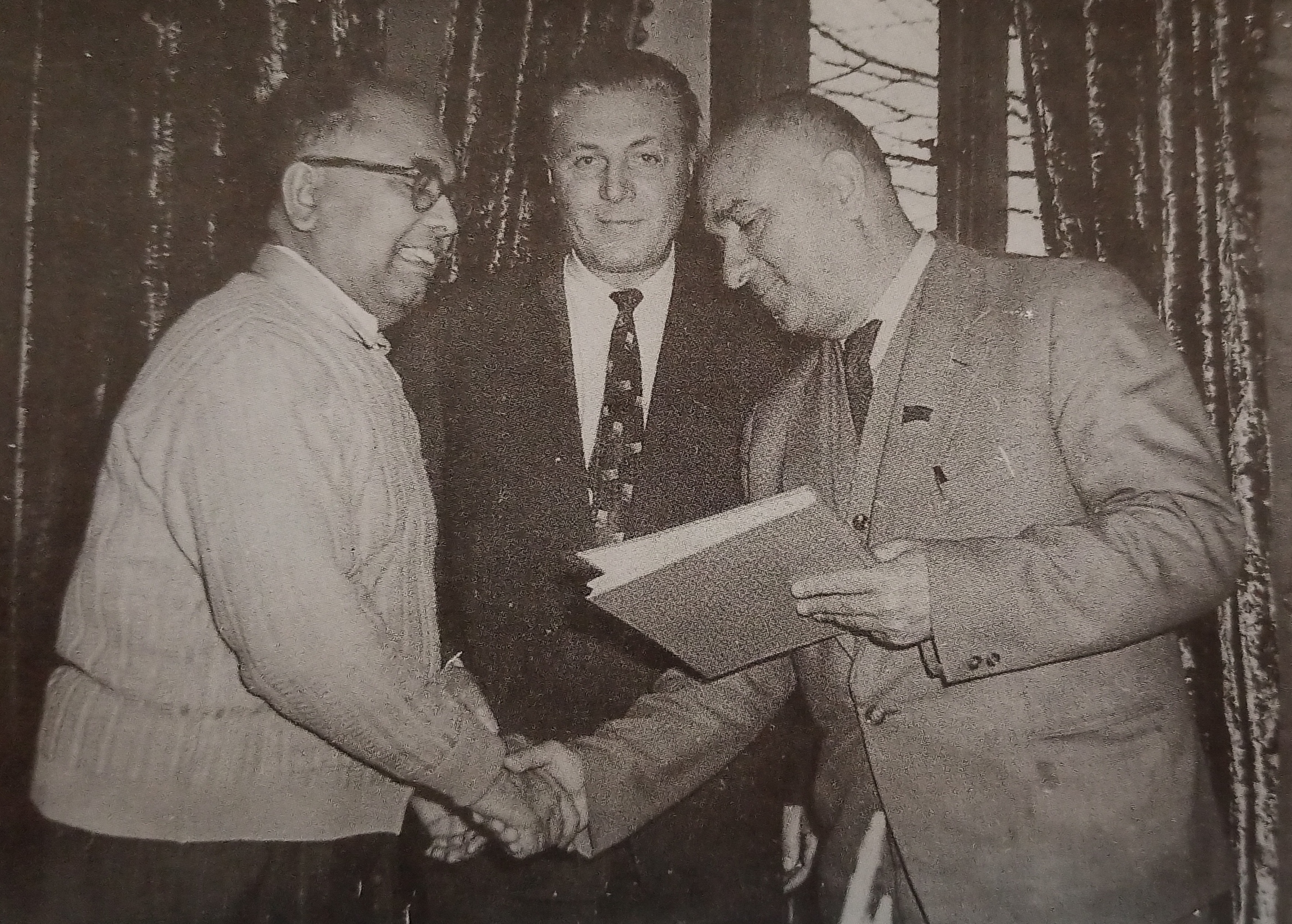
Niranjan Sengupta (left), shaking hands with a certain Communist leader (right) during his Ukraine tour, and interpreter (middle).

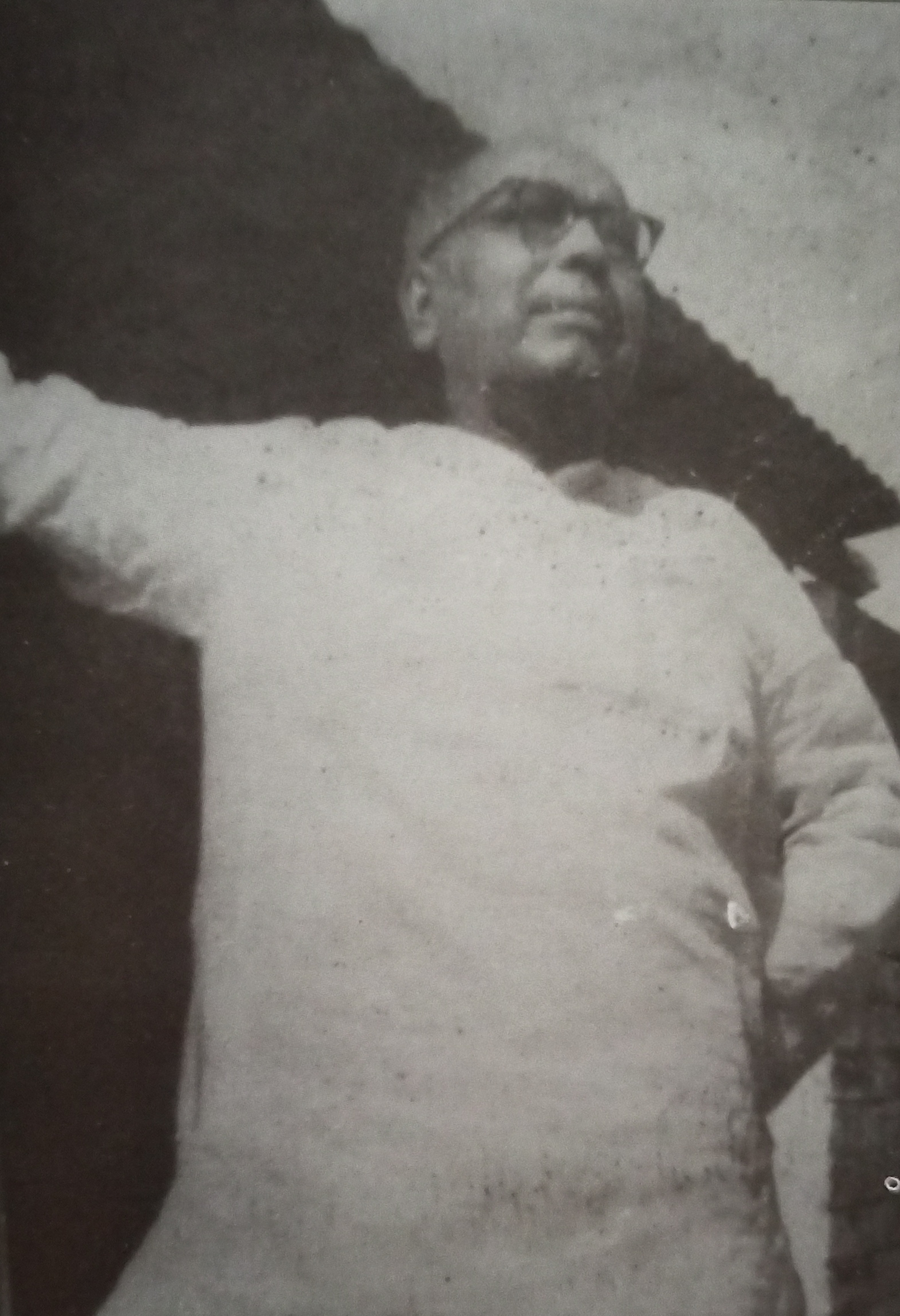
Niranjan Sengupta at his Bansdroni residence in 1962. He was the MLA of Tollygunge then.

== Death ==
Niranjan Sengupta died on 4 September 1969, around 3:15 AM, at Ramakrishna Seva Sadan (now Ramakrishna Mission Seva Pratishthan) of Calcutta (now Kolkata).

== Legacy ==
A half-bust statue of Niranjan Sengupta has been erected at Ranikuthi More to commemorate his contribution to India's freedom struggle and independence as a revolutionary and freedom fighter, and also to the refugee community as a minister of the Communist Party of India (Marxist). The road next to it, starting from Ranikuthi More up to G.D. Birla Centre for Education More has been named in his honour as Niranjan Sengupta Sarani. A performing arts theatre and auditorium named Niranjan Sadan has been built in his memory at Bijoygarh, opposite to Vijaygarh Jyotish Ray College.Which area was under Tollygunge assembly constituency during he was MLA.(1962–1967)

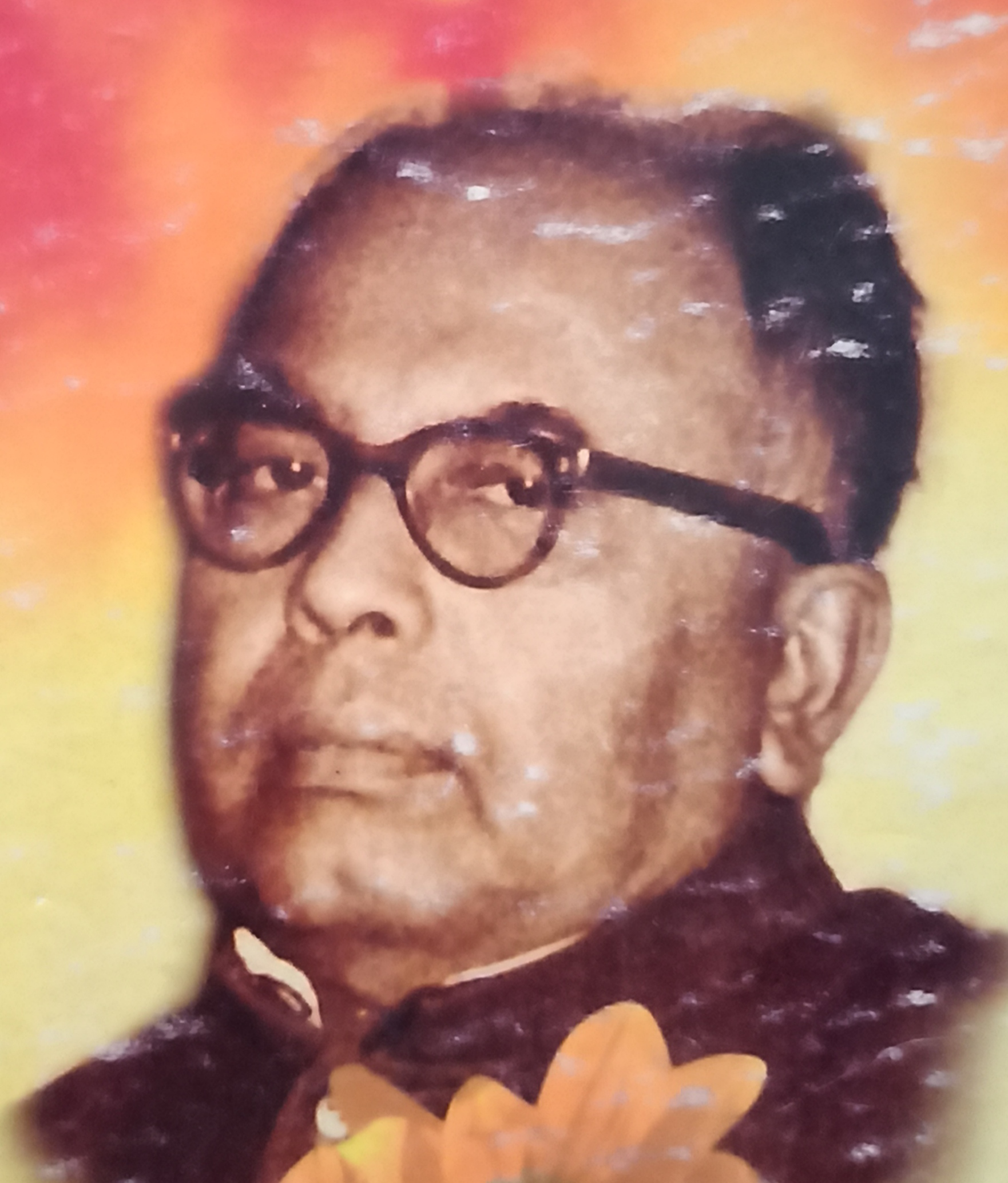
Niranjan Sengupta in his veteran days.
