= Calcutta Tramways Company =

State-run company in West Bengal, India

- CTC Logo

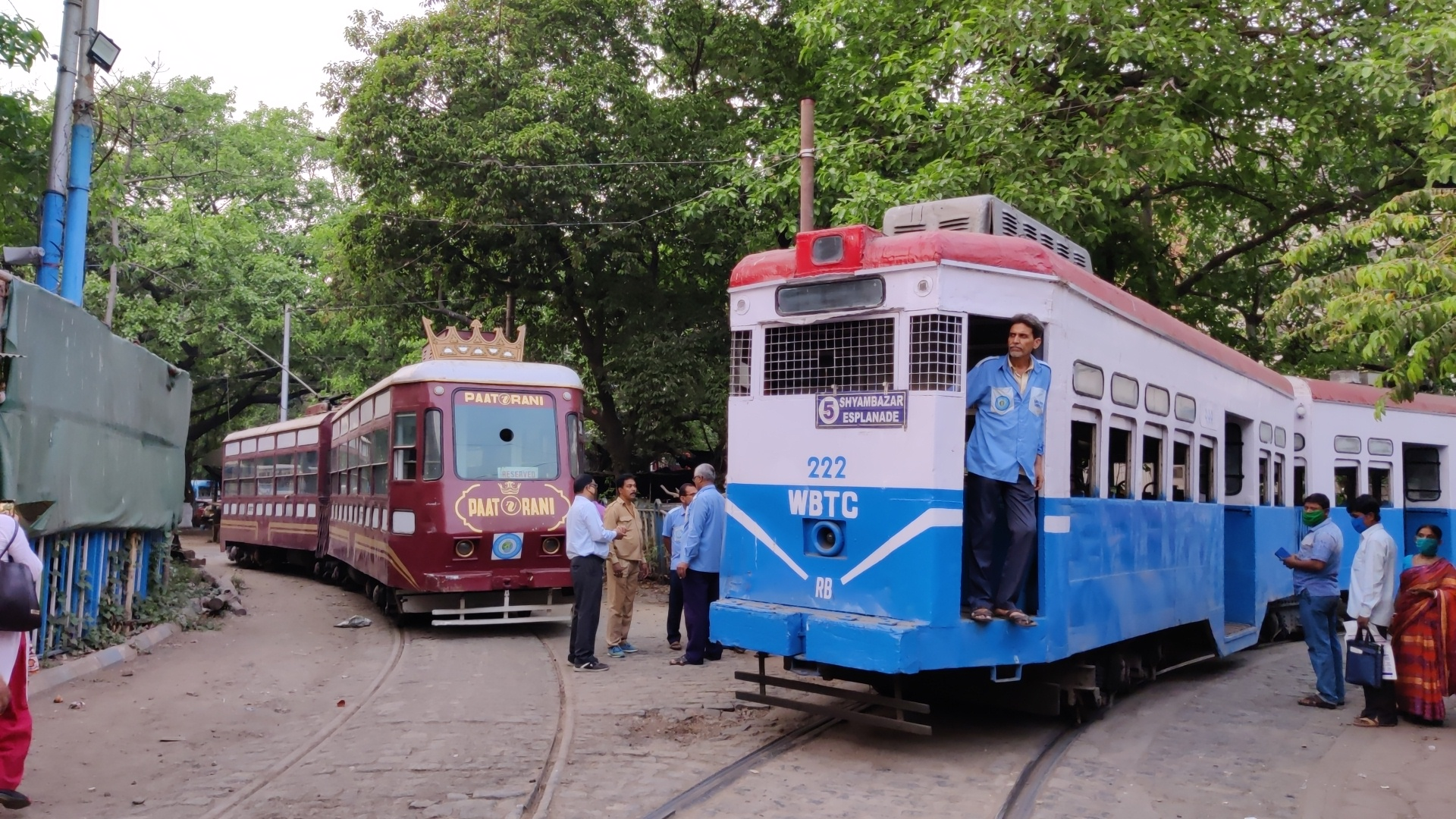
- Kolkata trams in 2021
- Type: Tram network
- Founded: December 22, 1880
- Fate: Merged with WBTC in 2016
- Successor: West Bengal Transport Corporation
- Headquarters: 12, R.N. Mukherjee Road, Kolkata 700001, Kolkata, West Bengal, India
- Area served: Kolkata
- Services: Tramway, Bus
- Owner: Government of West Bengal
- Parent: Calcutta Tramways Company Limited (London)
- Website: calcuttatramways.com

Calcutta Tramways Company (CTC) was a state-run company that operated trams and buses in and around Kolkata (formerly known as Calcutta) in West Bengal, India. The Kolkata tram is the only operating tramway in India and the oldest electric tram in India, operating since 1902.

CTC was merged into WBTC in 2016.

== History ==
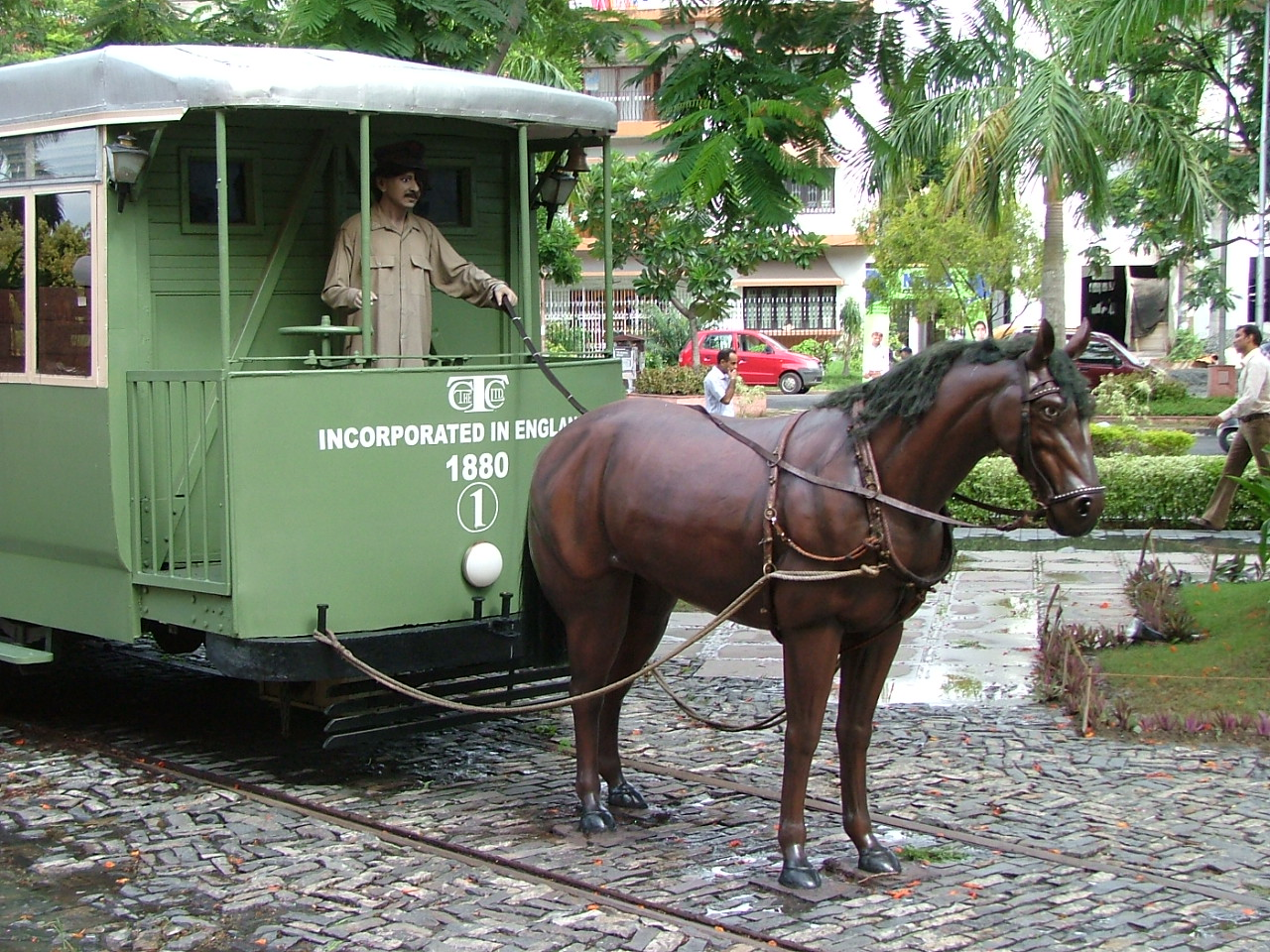
Life-size model of a horse-drawn tram at the City Centre arcade

The first horse-drawn trams in India ran for 2.4 miles (3.9 km) between Sealdah and Armenian Ghat Street on 24 February 1873. The service was discontinued on 20 November of that year. The Calcutta Tramway Company was formed and registered in London on 22 December 1880. Metre-gauge horse-drawn tram tracks were laid from Sealdah to Armenian Ghat via Bowbazar Street, Dalhousie Square and Strand Road. The route was inaugurated by the Viceroy, Lord Ripon, on 1 November 1880. In 1882, steam locomotives were deployed experimentally to haul tram cars.

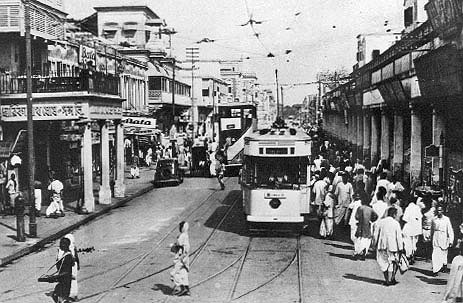
A tram in 1945

In 1900, the electrification of the tramway and conversion of its tracks to 4 ft 8 1/2 in (1,435 mm) (standard gauge) began. The first electric tramcar in Calcutta ran from Esplanade to Kidderpore on 27 March 1902. In February 1943, the Calcutta and Howrah sections were connected by the new Howrah Bridge.

In 1951, the government of West Bengal entered an agreement with the Calcutta Tramways Company and the Calcutta Tramways Act of 1951 was enacted. The government assumed the tramways, reserving the right to purchase the system with two years' notice on 1 January 1972 or at any time thereafter. In 1967, the Government of West Bengal passed the Calcutta Tramways Company (Taking Over of Management) Act and assumed management on 19 July. On 8 November 1976, the Calcutta Tramways (Acquisition of Undertaking) ordinance was promulgated under which the company (and its assets) was nationalised.

The Tramways system had degraded by the 1990s, and Minister for Transport Shyamal Chakraborty planned to close the network. In the meantime, Calcutta Tramways Company introduced bus service on 4 November 1992 with a fleet of 40 buses. However, Melbourne tram conductor Roberto D'Andrea befriended fellow Calcutta conductors during a 1994 visit. When D'Andrea heard about the planned closure of tram network, he suggested an art project to decorate the trams (as was done in his home city). The project increased public awareness of the tram network and its value, ultimately saving it.

== Trams ==
The Calcutta Tramways Company Ltd operates the Kolkata tram, currently the oldest electric tramway in Asia and India's only existent tram system, since 1873.

== Buses ==
With over 45 routes throughout Kolkata and its surrounding areas, CTC buses complement its tram service. The initial bus service was introduced from Rajabazar with a fleet of 40 buses, augmented in 1993 with service from Kidderpore depot. The Tollygunge and Belgachia depots were added in 1994 and 1995, respectively. In 2005 the CTC began bus service from Ghasbagan depot at Howrah.

== Depots, terminals and workshops ==
There are seven tram depots: Belgachia, Rajabazar, Park Circus, Gariahat, Tollygunge, Kalighat and Kidderpore. Rajabazar and Tollygunge depots are the largest in terms of tracks and area, respectively. and Kalighat tram depot is the oldest and smallest. There were tram depot at Joka and Ghasbagan, Howrah. Now a Bus Depot. There are also CTC bus depots in Barasat, Habra and Titagarh.

There are six tram terminals: Shyambazar, Bidhan Nagar Road, Ballygunge Station, Esplanade, Galiff Street, B.B.D. Bag (currently closed, work going on resume its services again) and Howrah Bridge. The Esplanade terminus serves most of the tram routes. Former tram terminals, all now either closed or converted into bus depots and terminals, had been at Shibpore, Bandhaghat, Bagbazar, Kolkata High Court, Nimtala, Behala, Sealdah Station, Howrah Station, Planetarium and Racecourse.

There is a central workshop near Mullickbazar: Nonapukur.

== Routes ==
2 Tram routes currently operate in Kolkata. Recently AC tram was also introduced.

== CTC Bus Routes ==
- ACT1 Barasat – Kudghat via Champadali, Madhyamgram Chowmatha, Birati More, Airport Gate 1, Baguihati, Ultadanga, E.M. Bypass, Science City, Ruby Hospital, Bosepukur, Ballygunge Station, Gariahat, Rashbehari, Tollygunge Tram Depot
- ACT4 Barasat – Salt Lake Karunamoyee via Champadali, Madhyamgram Chowmatha, Birati More, Airport Gate 1, Chinar Park, Eco Park, Narkelbagan, New Town, College More
- ACT5 Barasat – Digha via Champadali, Madhyamgram Chowmatha, Birati More, Airport Gate 1, Baguihati, Ultadanga, Maniktala, Esplanade, Santragachi, Jalan Complex, Dhulagarh, Ranihati, Nimdighi, Bagnan Library More, Kolaghat, Mecheda, Radhamoni, Nimtouri, Nandakumar, Norghat, Chandipur, Henria, Bajkul, Contai, Chaulkhola, Pichaboni, Old Digha
- ACT6A Shyambazar – Digha via Sovabazar, Girish Park, Central Avenue, Esplanade, Santragachi, Jalan Complex, Dhulagarh, Ranihati, Nimdighi, Bagnan Library More, Kolaghat, Mecheda, Radhamoni, Nimtouri, Nandakumar, Norghat, Chandipur, Henria, Bajkul, Contai, Chaulkhola, Pichaboni, Old Digha
- ACT7 Kolkata (Esplanade) – Mayapur via Sealdah, Maniktala, Kankurgachi, Ultadanga, Baguihati, Airport Gate 1, Madhyamgram Chowmatha, Barasat Colony More, Amdanga, Awalsiddhi, Barajaguli More, Kalyani More, Birohi Chowmatha, Simurali Chowmatha, Chakdah Chowmatha, Ranaghat, Santipur Bypass, Dignagar, Bhatjangla More, Krishnanagar Nabadwip More, PWD More, Chowgacha, Bamanpukur
- ACT8 Habra – Digha via Ashoknagar, Duttapukur, Barasat Champadali, Madhyamgram Chowmatha, Birati More, Airport Gate 3, Dunlop, Nivedita Setu, Salap, Jalan Complex, Dhulagarh, Ranihati, Nimdighi, Bagnan Library More, Kolaghat, Mecheda, Radhamoni, Nimtouri, Nandakumar, Norghat, Chandipur, Henria, Bajkul, Contai, Chaulkhola, Pichaboni, Old Digha
- ACT8A Barasat – Digha via Champadali, Madhyamgram Chowmatha, Birati More, Airport Gate 3, Dunlop, Nivedita Setu, Salap, Jalan Complex, Dhulagarh, Ranihati, Nimdighi, Bagnan Library More, Kolaghat, Mecheda, Radhamoni, Nimtouri, Nandakumar, Norghat, Chandipur, Henria, Bajkul, Contai, Chaulkhola, Pichaboni, Old Digha
- ACT10 Barasat – Asansol via Champadali, Madhyamgram Chowmatha, Airport Gate 3, Dunlop (Baranagar Road Station), Nivedita Setu, Dankuni Housing, Palsit Toll, Barddhaman Nababhat, Panagarh Bypass, Muchipara, Durgapur City Centre, Raniganj Punjabi More, Kalipahari, Chelidanga
- ACT11 Belur Math – Joyrambati via Ballykhal, Bally Halt, Dankuni Station, Kalipur, Chanditala, Moshat, Sheakhala, Gojar More, Sipalgachi, Champadanga, Harinkhola, Sodepur, Mayapur, Arambagh Bus Stand, Kalipur More, Goghat, Vikdas More, Kamarpukur
- ACT12 Kolkata (Esplanade) – Asansol via Vidyasagar Setu, Santragachi, Salap, Dankuni Housing, Palsit Toll, Barddhaman Nababhat, Panagarh Bypass, Muchipara, Durgapur City Centre, Raniganj Punjabi More, Kalipahari, Chelidanga
- ACT15 Kolkata (Esplanade) – Bakkhali via P.G. Hospital, Bhabani Bhawan, Majherhat, Behala, Thakurpukur, Joka, Pailan, Khariberia, Amtala, Sirakole, Fatehpur, Dostipur, Sarisha Ashram More, Kapathat, Diamond Harbour, Hatuganj, Kulpi, Karanjali, Nischintapur, 5 No. Hat, Kakdwip, Ukilerhat, Namkhana Station, Lalpole, 10 Mile, Fraserganj
- ACT16 Salt Lake Karunamoyee – Suri via City Centre, Ultadanga, Baguihati, Airport Gate No.1, Dunlop (Baranagar Road Station), Dankuni Housing Estate, Palsit Toll, Saktigarh, Barddhaman Nababhat, Galsi, Budbud Bypass, Panagarh, Darjeeling More, Trilokechandrapur, Ilambazar, Sriniketan, Bolpur Jamboni Bus Stand, Panrui, Hatikara Bridge, Purandarpur
- ACT16A Barasat – Suri via Champadali, Madhyamgram Chowmatha, Airport Gate 3, Dunlop (Baranagar Road Station), Nivedita Setu, Dankuni Housing, Palsit Toll, Barddhaman Nababhat, Panagarh, Darjeeling More, Ilambazar, Sriniketan, Bolpur Jamboni Bus Stand, Panrui, Purandarpur
- ACT17 Kolkata (Esplanade) – Siliguri via Ultadanga, Airport Gate 1, Madhyamgram Chowmatha, Barasat Colony More, Jagulia, Chakdah Chowmatha, Ranaghat, Shantipur Bypass, Krishnanagar Nabadwip More, Bethuadahari, Palashi, Beharampore, Palsanda, Moregram, Omarpur, Ahiran, Farakka, Kaliachak, Malda, Gazole, Itahar, Raiganj, Tungidighi, Karandighi, Dalkhola, Kishanganj, Islampur Bypass, Ghoshpukur, Bagdogra, Medical More, Noukaghat More, Airview More
- ACT21 Kolkata West International City – Ecospace via Salap, Lalbari, Santragachi, Belepole, Rabindra Sadan, Minto Park, Park Circus, 4 No. Bridge, Topsia, Science City, Chingrighata, College More, Technopolis, New Town, Narkelbagan, Unitech Gate 2, TCS Geetanjali Park
- ACT23 Dankuni Housing – Park Circus via Rajchanrapur, Bally Halt, Dakshineshwar, Dunlop, Mathkal, Durganagar, Airport Gate 3, Airport Gate 1, Chinar Park, Akansha, Eco Park, Narkelbagan, New Town, Technopolis, College More, SDF, Chingrighata, Science City, Topsia, 4 No. Bridge
- ACT23A Airport Gate 1 – Park Circus via Chinar Park, Akansha, Eco Park, Narkelbagan, New Town, Technopolis, College More, SDF, Chingrighata, Science City, Topsia, 4 No. Bridge
- ACT24 Rajabazar – Howrah Station via Barabazar, M.G. Road/Dalhousie
- ACT26 Howrah Station – Baruipur via Barabazar, Esplanade, Moulali, CIT Road, Chittaranjan Hospital, 4 No. Bridge, Topsia, Science City, Ruby Hospital, Kalikapur, Ajoynagar, Hiland Park, Patuli, Dhalai Bridge, Kamalgazi, Narendrapur, Rajpur, Harinavi, Gobindapur, Padmapukur, Shibanipith, Rabindra Bhawan, Puratan Bazar, Phooltala Bus Terminal
- ACT26A Howrah Station – Kamalgazi via Barabazar, Esplanade, Moulali, CIT Road, Chittaranjan Hospital, 4 No. Bridge, Topsia, Science City, Ruby Hospital, Kalikapur, Ajoynagar, Hiland Park, Patuli, Dhalai Bridge
- ACT32 Howrah Station – Barrackpore Court via Barabazar, M.G. Road, Central Avenue, Girish Park, Sovabazar, Shyambazar, Sinthee More, Dunlop, Rathtala, Kamarhati, Sodepur Traffic More, Balaram Hospital, Khardah, Tata Gate, Titagarh Bazar, Talpukur Bazar, Barrackpore Chiria More, Barrackpore Cantonment, Dhobi Ghat
- ACT33 Baruipur – Salt Lake / Ecospace via Phooltala Bus Terminal, Puratan Bazar, Rabindra Bhawan, Shibanipith, Padmapukur, Gobindapur, Harinavi, Rajpur, Narendrapur, Kamalgazi, Dhalai Bridge, Patuli, Hiland Park, Ajoynagar, Kalikapur, Ruby Hospital, Science City, Chingrighata, College More, Technopolis, New Town, Narkelbagan, Unitech Gate 2, TCS Geetanjali Park
- ACT33A Kamalgazi – Salt Lake / Ecospace via Dhalai Bridge, Patuli, Hiland Park, Ajoynagar, Kalikapur, Ruby Hospital, Science City, Chingrighata, College More, Technopolis, New Town, Narkelbagan, Unitech Gate 2, TCS Geetanjali Park
- ACT34 Tollygunge – Barrackpore Lalkuthi via Rashbehari, Hazra, Rabindra Sadan, Esplanade, Central Avenue, Girish Park, Sovabazar, Shyambazar, Sinthee More, Dunlop, Rathtala, Kamarhati, Sodepur Traffic More, Balaram Hospital, Khardah, Tata Gate, Titagarh Bazar, Talpukur Bazar, Barrackpore Chiria More, Barrackpore Station
- ACT35 Barasat – Joka via Champadali, Madhyamgram Chowmatha, Birati More, Airport Gate 1, Chinar Park, Eco Park, Narkelbagan, New Town, College More, SDF, Chingrighata, Science City, Ruby Hospital, Bosepukur, Ballygunge Station, Gariahat, Rashbehari, New Alipore, Taratala, Behala, Sakherbazar, Sealpara, Thakurpukur
- ACT36 Belgachia – Ecospace via R.G. Kar Hospital, Shyambazar, Khanna, Ultadanga, City Centre, Bikash Bhawan, Karunamoyee, College More, Technopolis, New Town, Tata Medical Centre, TCS Geetanjali Park
- ACT37 Howrah Station – Diamond Harbour via Barabazar, Esplanade, P.G. Hospital, Bhabani Bhawan, Majherhat, Behala, Thakurpukur, Joka, Pailan, Khariberia, Amtala, Sirakole, Fatehpur, Dostipur, Sarisha Ashram More, Diamond Harbour Station, Diamond Harbour Jetty Ghat, Nagendrabazar
- ACT38 Salt Lake Karunamoyee – Barrackpore Lalkuthi via College More, Technopolis, New Town, Narkelbagan, Eco Park, Akansha, Chinar Park, Airport Gate 1, Durganagar, Mathkal, Dunlop, Dakshineshwar, Rathtala, Kamarhati, Sodepur Traffic More, Balaram Hospital, Khardah, Tata Gate, Titagarh Bazar, Talpukur Bazar, Barrackpore Chiria More, Barrackpore Station
- ACT41 R.G. Kar Hospital – Joka via Shyambazar, Sealdah, Bowbazar, Dalhousie, Babughat, Khidderpore, Mominpore, Majherhat, Behala Tram Depot, Behala Chowrasta, Sakherbazar, Sealpara, Thakurpukur
- C2A Tollygunge – Ghatakpukur via M.R. Bangur Hospital, Tollygunge Phari, Rashbehari, Deshapriya Park, Gariahat, Ballygunge Station, Bosepukur, Ruby Hospital, VIP Bazar, Science City, Bantala Bazar, Bamanghata Bazar, Leather Complex, Bhojherhat, Boralighat, Nalmuri
- C37 Howrah Station – Amtala via Barabazar, Esplanade, Fort William, Khidderpore, Ekbalpore, Mominpore, Majherhat, Behala, Thakurpukur, Joka, Pailan, Khariberia
- D1A Barasat – Tollygunge via Champadali, Madhyamgram Chowmatha, Birati More, Airport Gate 1, Baguihati, Kestopur, VIP Road, Ultadanga, Mani Square, Kadapara, Beliaghata Building More, Chingrighata, Science City, Ruby Hospital, Bosepukur, Ballygunge Station, Gariahat, Rashbehari, Tollygunge Phari, M.R. Bangur Hospital
- D2 Habra – Naihati via Nalda Bazar, Haripur, Kalyangarh, Kachua More, Chowranghee, 8 No. Kalibari, Madartala, Ishwarigacha, Awalsiddhi, Sikra, Dariyapur, Hamidpur, Kuliagarh, Saheb Colony, Ramkrishna Talkies, Garifa Bridge, Naihati Station
- D5A Bally Halt – Salt Lake Karunamoyee via Dakshineshwar, Dunlop, Mathkal, Durganagar, Airport Gate 1, Chinar Park, Eco Park, Narkelbagan, New Town, Technopolis, College More, Wipro More
- D10 Barasat – Amtala via Champadali, Madhyamgram Chowmatha, Birati More, Airport Gate 1, Chinar Park, Eco Park, Narkelbagan, New Town, College More, SDF, Chingrighata, Science City, Ruby Hospital, Bosepukur, Ballygunge Station, Gariahat, Rashbehari, Tollygunge, Karunamoyee, Haridebpur, Kabardanga, Cancer Hospital, Thakurpukur, Pailan, Bhasa, Khariberia, Bishnupur P.S.
- D12A Howrah Station – Habra via Barabazar, Esplanade, Moulali, Sealdah, Beliaghata, Rashmoni Bazar, Building More, Chingrighata, Nicco Park, College More, Technopolis, New Town, Narkelbagan, Unitech Gate 2, TCS Geetanjali Park, Ecospace, ALiah University, Eco Park, Akansha, Chinar Park, Airport Gate 1, Birati More, B.T. College, Madhyamgram Chowmatha, Dakbungalow More, Barasat Champadali, Duttapukur, Bira Chowmatha, Guma Chowmatha, Ashoknagar 8 No. Kalibari
- D19B Barasat – Salt Lake Karunamoyee via Champadali, Madhyamgram Chowmatha, Birati More, Airport Gate 1, Chinar Park, Eco Park, Narkelbagan, New Town, Technopolis, College More, Wipro More
- D21 Esplanade – Nazat via Science City, Bantala Bazar, Bamanghata Bazar, Leather Complex, Bhojherhat, Boralighat, Ghatakpukur, Ghusighata, Minakhan, Malancha, Chaital Ghat, Bokchara, Bhebia Bazar, Murarisha Chowmatha, Rajapur, Kharampur, Dakshin Akharatala, Dukhirampool Bazar, Metiakhali Bazar
- D27A Jadavpur – Habra via Santoshpur, Ajoynagar, Kalikapur, Ruby Hospital, Science City, Chingrighata, Nicco Park, College More, Technopolis, New Town, Narkelbagan, Eco Park, Akansha, Chinar Park, Airport Gate 1, Birati More, B.T. College, Madhyamgram Chowmatha, Dakbungalow More, Barasat Champadali, Duttapukur, Bira Chowmatha, Guma Chowmatha, Ashoknagar 8 No. Kalibari
- D27E Jadavpur – Ecospace via Santoshpur, Ajoynagar, Kalikapur, Ruby Hospital, Science City, Chingrighata, Nicco Park, College More, Technopolis, New Town, Narkelbagan, Unitech Gate 2, TCS Geetanjali Park
- D28 Esplanade – Chakla
- D36 Belgachia – Ecospace via R.G. Kar Hospital, Shyambazar, Khanna, Ultadanga, City Centre, Bikash Bhawan, Karunamoyee, College More, Technopolis, New Town, Tata Medical Centre, TCS Geetanjali Park
- D40 Habra – Kudghat via Ashoknagar, Duttapukur, Barasat Champadali, Madhyamgram Chowmatha, Birati More, Airport Gate 1, Chinar Park, Akansha, Eco Park, Narkelbagan, New Town, College More, SDF, Chingrighata, Science City, Ruby Hospital, Bosepukur, Ballygunge Station, Gariahat, Deshapriya Park, Rashbehari, Tollygunge Tram Depot
- D40A Barasat – Kudghat via Champadali, Madhyamgram Chowmatha, Birati More, Airport Gate 1, Chinar Park, Akansha, Eco Park, Narkelbagan, New Town, College More, SDF, Chingrighata, Science City, Ruby Hospital, Bosepukur, Ballygunge Station, Gariahat, Deshapriya Park, Rashbehari, Tollygunge Tram Depot
- D40E Kudghat – Ecospace via Tollygunge Tram Depot, Rashbehari, Deshapriya Park, Gariahat, Ballygunge Station, Bosepukur, Ruby Hospital, Science City, Chingrighata, Nicco Park, College More, Technopolis, New Town, Narkelbagan, Unitech Gate 2, TCS Geetanjali Park
- E6A Howrah Station – Amta via Barabazar, Esplanade, P.G. Hospital, Vidyasagar Setu, Santragachi, Ankurhati, Jalan Complex, Alampur, Dhulagarh, Ranihati, Gabberia, Manikpir, 10 No. Pole, Chakhna, Kalatala
- E12 Esplanade – Udaynarayanpur via P.G. Hospital, Vidyasagar Setu, Santragachi, Salap, Makardaha, Domjur, Rajapur, Santoshpur, Baragachia, Patihal, Munsirhat, Penro Bazar, Khila, Joynagar Bridge, Singti Bazar, Sibanipur
- E15 Esplanade – Gadiara via P.G. Hospital, Vidyasagar Setu, Santragachi, Ankurhati, Jalan Complex, Alampur, Dhulagarh, Ranihati, Panchla, Khalisani Kalitala, Mansatala, Nimdighi, Gangarampur, Uluberia Station, Goruhata More, Kalinagar, Moubeshia, Dhulasimla, Baganda, Mohini More, 58 Gate, Garhchumuk, Sapur, Kharuberia, Shyampur, Gurjarpur
- E17 Barasat – Digha via Champadali, Madhyamgram Chowmatha, Birati More, Airport Gate 1, Baguihati, Ultadanga, Maniktala, Esplanade, Santragachi, Jalan Complex, Dhulagarh, Ranihati, Nimdighi, Bagnan Library More, Kolaghat, Mecheda, Radhamoni, Nimtouri, Nandakumar, Norghat, Chandipur, Henria, Bajkul, Contai, Chaulkhola, Pichaboni, Old Digha
- E17/1 Barasat – Digha via Champadali, Madhyamgram Chowmatha, Birati More, Airport Gate 3, Dunlop, Nivedita Setu, Salap, Jalan Complex, Dhulagarh, Ranihati, Nimdighi, Bagnan Library More, Kolaghat, Mecheda, Radhamoni, Nimtouri, Nandakumar, Norghat, Chandipur, Henria, Bajkul, Contai, Chaulkhola, Pichaboni, Old Digha
- E17K Barasat – Digha via Champadali, Madhyamgram Chowmatha, Birati More, Airport Gate 1, Chinar Park, Akansha, Eco Park, Narkelbagan, New Town, Technopolis, College More, Salt Lake Karunamoyee, Beliaghata Building More, CIT More, Sealdah, Esplanade, Santragachi, Jalan Complex, Dhulagarh, Ranihati, Nimdighi, Bagnan Library More, Kolaghat, Mecheda, Radhamoni, Nimtouri, Nandakumar, Norghat, Chandipur, Henria, Bajkul, Contai, Chaulkhola, Pichaboni, Old Digha
- E19 Habra – Digha via Ashoknagar, Duttapukur, Barasat Champadali, Madhyamgram Chowmatha, Birati More, Airport Gate 3, Dunlop, Nivedita Setu, Salap, Jalan Complex, Dhulagarh, Ranihati, Nimdighi, Bagnan Library More, Kolaghat, Mecheda, Radhamoni, Nimtouri, Nandakumar, Norghat, Chandipur, Henria, Bajkul, Contai, Chaulkhola, Pichaboni, Old Digha
- E19A Habra – Digha via Ashoknagar, Duttapukur, Barasat Champadali, Madhyamgram Chowmatha, Birati More, Airport Gate 1, Baguihati, Ultadanga, Maniktala, Esplanade, Santragachi, Jalan Complex, Dhulagarh, Ranihati, Nimdighi, Bagnan Library More, Kolaghat, Mecheda, Radhamoni, Nimtouri, Nandakumar, Norghat, Chandipur, Henria, Bajkul, Contai, Chaulkhola, Pichaboni, Old Digha
- E19D Belgachia – Digha via Shyambazar, Sovabazar, Girish Park, Central Avenue, Esplanade, Santragachi, Jalan Complex, Dhulagarh, Ranihati, Nimdighi, Bagnan Library More, Kolaghat, Mecheda, Radhamoni, Nimtouri, Nandakumar, Norghat, Chandipur, Henria, Bajkul, Contai, Chaulkhola, Pichaboni, Old Digha
- E27 Rajabazar – Uluberia via Sealdah, Moulali, Esplanade, P.G. Hospital, Vidyasagar Setu, Santragachi, Ankurhati, Jalan Complex, Alampur, Dhulagarh, Ranihati, Panchla, Khalisani Kalitala, Mansatala, Nimdighi, Gangarampur, Uluberia Station, Goruhata More, Uluberia Court, Egarofotok Bus Stand
- E28A Howrah Station – Kulia Ghat via Howrah Maidan, Foreshore Road, Belepole, Santragachi, Ankurhati, Jalan Complex, Alampur, Dhulagarh, Ranihati, Panchla, Khalisani Kalitala, Mansatala, Nimdighi, Birshibpur, Kulgachia, Bagnan Bus Stand, Mankur More, Hijlak, Patinan, Khalna More, Kalyanpur, Bakshirhat, Zero Point, Dhanyagari, Ajangachi, Kashmali
- E36B Barasat – Santragachi via Champadali, Madhyamgram Chowmatha, B.T. College, Birati More, Airport Gate 1, Kaikhali, Baguihati, Kestopur, Lake Town (VIP), Ultadanga, Kankurgachi, Maniktala, Girish Park, Central Avenue, Bowbazar, Lalbazar, Esplanade, Rabindra Sadan, P.G. Hospital, Vidyasagar Setu, Nabanna Toll, Carry Road, Belepole, Baksara
- E36E Santragachhi – Ecospace via Baksara, Belepole, Carry Road, Vidyasagar Setu, P.T.S., Rabindra Sadan, Minto Park, Park Circus, 4 No. Bridge, Topsia, Science City, Chingrighata, College More, Technopolis, New Town, Narkelbagan, Unitech Gate 2, TCS Geetanjali Park
- E45 Joka – Digha via Thakurpukur, Cancer Hospital, Kabardanga, Haridebpur, Karunamoyee, Tollygunge, Rashbehari, Hazra, Rabindra Sadan, Esplanade, Santragachi, Jalan Complex, Dhulagarh, Ranihati, Nimdighi, Bagnan Library More, Kolaghat, Mecheda, Radhamoni, Nimtouri, Nandakumar, Norghat, Chandipur, Henria, Bajkul, Contai, Chaulkhola, Pichaboni, Old Digha
- E45A Tollygunge – Digha via Rashbehari, Hazra, Rabindra Sadan, Esplanade, Santragachi, Jalan Complex, Dhulagarh, Ranihati, Nimdighi, Bagnan Library More, Kolaghat, Mecheda, Radhamoni, Nimtouri, Nandakumar, Norghat, Chandipur, Henria, Bajkul, Contai, Chaulkhola, Pichaboni, Old Digha
- E55 Madhyamgram – Digha via Sajirhat, Muragachha, Ghola Bazar, Sodepur Traffic More, Dunlop, Nivedita Setu, Salap, Jalan Complex, Dhulagarh, Ranihati, Nimdighi, Bagnan Library More, Kolaghat, Mecheda, Radhamoni, Nimtouri, Nandakumar, Norghat, Chandipur, Henria, Bajkul, Contai, Chaulkhola, Pichaboni, Old Digha
- E59B Barasat – Digha via Champadali, Colony More, Nilgunge, Wireless More, Barrackpore Station, Titagarh, Sodepur Traffic More, Dunlop, Nivedita Setu, Salap, Jalan Complex, Dhulagarh, Ranihati, Nimdighi, Bagnan Library More, Kolaghat, Mecheda, Radhamoni, Nimtouri, Nandakumar, Norghat, Chandipur, Henria, Bajkul, Contai, Chaulkhola, Pichaboni, Old Digha
- E61 Habra – Bakkhali via Ashoknagar, Guma Chowmatha, Duttapukur, Barasat Champadali, Madhyamgram Chowmatha, Birati More, Airport Gate 1, Baguihati, Ultadanga, Kankurgachi, Maniktala, Vivekananda Road, Girish Park, Central Avenue, Esplanade, P.G. Hospital, Bhabani Bhawan, Majherhat, Behala, Thakurpukur, Joka, Pailan, Khariberia, Amtala, Sirakole, Fatehpur, Dostipur, Sarisha Ashram More, Kapathat, Diamond Harbour, Hatuganj, Kulpi, Karanjali, Nischintapur, 5 No. Hat, Kakdwip, Ukilerhat, Namkhana Station, Lalpole, 10 Mile, Fraserganj
- E61A Habra – Namkhana via Ashoknagar, Guma Chowmatha, Duttapukur, Barasat Champadali, Madhyamgram Chowmatha, Birati More, Airport Gate 1, Baguihati, Ultadanga, Kankurgachi, Maniktala, Vivekananda Road, Girish Park, Central Avenue, Esplanade, P.G. Hospital, Bhabani Bhawan, Majherhat, Behala, Thakurpukur, Joka, Pailan, Khariberia, Amtala, Sirakole, Fatehpur, Dostipur, Sarisha Ashram More, Kapathat, Diamond Harbour, Hatuganj, Kulpi, Karanjali, Nischintapur, 5 No. Hat, Kakdwip, Ukilerhat
- E70 Habra – Jhargram via Ashoknagar, Duttapukur, Barasat Champadali, Madhyamgram Chowmatha, Birati More, Airport Gate 3, Dunlop, Nivedita Setu, Salap, Jalan Complex, Dhulagarh, Ranihati, Nimdighi, Bagnan Library More, Kolaghat, Mechogram, Panskura Bypass, Ashari, Debra Bazar, Kharagpur Chowranghee More, Midnapore Bus Stand, Rangamati, Chandra, Dherua, Sevayatan
- E70A Habra – Midnapore via Ashoknagar, Duttapukur, Barasat Champadali, Madhyamgram Chowmatha, Birati More, Airport Gate 3, Dunlop, Nivedita Setu, Salap, Jalan Complex, Dhulagarh, Ranihati, Nimdighi, Bagnan Library More, Kolaghat, Mechogram, Panskura Bypass, Ashari, Debra Bazar, Kharagpur Chowranghee More, Keranitola
- E70B Barasat – Midnapore via Madhyamgram Chowmatha, Birati More, Airport Gate 3, Dunlop, Nivedita Setu, Salap, Jalan Complex, Dhulagarh, Ranihati, Nimdighi, Bagnan Library More, Kolaghat, Mechogram, Panskura Bypass, Ashari, Debra Bazar, Kharagpur Chowranghee More, Keranitola
- E76 Habra – Kalyani Bus Stand via Joygachi, Kalyangarh, Kachua More, Daulatpur, Sendanga Bazar, Pumlia Bazar, Noorpur, Srikrishnapur, Amragachhi, Rajberia, Jagulia, MAKAUT, Kalyani More, AIIMS, Basantapur, Gayeshpur, Chandmari, Kalyani Railgate
- E77 Esplanade – Sukanta Park via P.G. Hospital, Vidyasagar Setu, Santragachi, Salap, Makardaha, Domjur, Rajapur, Santoshpur, Baragachia, Jagatballavpur, Mator More, Borohal, Khurigachi, Dilakash, Bilaspur
- E78 Esplanade – Bakkhali via P.G. Hospital, Bhabani Bhawan, Majherhat, Behala, Thakurpukur, Joka, Pailan, Khariberia, Amtala, Sirakole, Fatehpur, Dostipur, Sarisha Ashram More, Kapathat, Diamond Harbour, Hatuganj, Kulpi, Karanjali, Nischintapur, 5 No. Hat, Kakdwip, Ukilerhat, Namkhana Station, Lalpole, 10 Mile, Fraserganj
- T3 Rajabazar – Ghatakpukur via Sealdah, Sarkar Bazar, Rashmoni Bazar, Beliaghata Building More, Chingrighata, Science City, Bantala Bazar, Bamanghata Bazar, Leather Complex, Bhojherhat, Boralighat
- T8 BBD Bagh – Tikiapara via Park Street, Rabindra Sadan, Hastings, Vidyasagar Setu, Nabanna Toll, Belepole, Natun Rasta More, Ichapore Water Tank, Kadamtala, Shanpur
- T10 Rajabazar – Chaital Ghat via Sealdah, Sarkar Bazar, Rashmoni Bazar, Beliaghata Building More, Chingrighata, Science City, Bantala Bazar, Bamanghata Bazar, Leather Complex, Bhojherhat, Boralighat, Ghatakpukur, Ghusighata, Minakhan, Malancha
- T12 Howrah Station – Chaital Ghat via Barabazar, Esplanade, Moulali, CIT Road, Chittaranjan Hospital, 4 No. Bridge, Topsia, Science City, Bantala Bazar, Bamanghata Bazar, Leather Complex, Bhojherhat, Boralighat, Ghatakpukur, Ghusighata, Minakhan, Malancha
- T15 Park Circus – Ghatakpukur via 4 No. Bridge, Topsia, Science City, Bantala Bazar, Bamanghata Bazar, Leather Complex, Bhojherhat, Boralighat, Ghatakpukur, Ghusighata, Minakhan, Malancha
- T16 Rajabazar – Mourigram Station via Sealdah, Moulali, Esplanade, Park Street, Rabindra Sadan, Vidyasagar Setu, Mandirtala, Narayana Hospital, College Ghat, Danesh Sk. Lane, B. Garden New Gate, Bakultala, Hanskhalipole, Podra, Chunabhati, Nimtala

== See also ==
- Trams in India
- Kolkata Metro
- Kolkata Suburban Railway
- Kolkata Circular Railway
- Kolkata Metro Rail Corporation
- Calcutta State Transport Corporation
- West Bengal Surface Transport Corporation
- South Bengal State Transport Corporation
- List of tram and light rail transit systems

== Notes ==
- Niyogi, S. Shake, rattle & roll. The Sunday Story, Sunday Times of India, Kolkata, 25 June 2006. Available on Times of India e-paper (paid subscription required as of 2010).
- Pathak Pratap Shankar, The Sunday Story, Sunday Times of India, Kolkata.
