= Bijoygarh =

Bijoygarh বিজয়গড়
- Neighbourhood in Kolkata
- Location in Kolkata Bijoygarh (West Bengal)
- Coordinates: 22°29′34″N 88°21′41″E
- Country: India
- State: West Bengal
- City: Kolkata
- District: Kolkata
- Region: Kolkata
- Metro Station: Mahanayak Uttam Kumar
- Kolkata Suburban Railway: Jadavpur Railway Station, Baghajatin Railway Station
- Municipal Corporation: Kolkata Municipal Corporation
- KMC ward: 95, 96, 98, 99

Government
  - Body: Borough No.10, Kolkata Municipal Corporation
- Elevation: 34 ft (10 m)
- Time zone: UTC+5:30 (IST)
- PIN: 700 032, 700 092
- Area code: +91 33
- Lok Sabha constituency: Kolkata Dakshin, Jadavpur
- Vidhan Sabha constituency: Tollygunge, Jadavpur

Bijoygarh is a neighbourhood located of the southern part of Kolkata, in West Bengal, India. The neighbourhood shares its boundary with Jadavpur, Baghajatin, Bikramgarh, Regent Estate and Ranikuthi.

Although it is merged with Kolkata, it still partially remain under the South 24 Parganas jurisdiction.

It has 3 schools, 1 college and 3 health care centre. Bijoygarh state general hospital is the 5th largest hospital in the South 24 Parganas district. It also falls under district magistrates, South 24 Parganas.

This area is served by Jadavpur police station of Kolkata police and Patuli women police station.

Bijoygarh was merged with the city of Kolkata on 23 July 2013.

Bijoygarh area has been considered busy area by Kolkata police and it is very close to Garia and Rajpur-Sonarpur which is also a city in South 24 Parganas.
