= Tollygunge Club =

Country club in Kolkata, India

The Tollygunge Club (Bengali: টালিগঞ্জ ক্লাব), popularly called Tolly Club, is a country club in India, located in Tollygunge in south Kolkata.

Sir William Cruikshank established the club as an equestrian sports facility in 1895 to "promote all manner of sports". It is spread over 100 acres (400,000 m^{2}), with a clubhouse that is over 200 years old.

== History ==
The extensive grounds of the club were originally an indigo plantation laid out in 1781 by the Johnson family, who were amongst the pioneers of the plantation industry in India.

Later the grounds were to become a royal park at the heart of the princely estate established by the exiled family of Tipu Sultan, the deposed ruler of Mysore and the house which the Johnsons had built as their home became the garden house of the new Mysore Estate.

In 1895, the entire property was acquired from the Mysore family by the Tollygunge Club Limited and the old Johnson home is today the club's clubhouse.

Tollygunge Club hosts the Chaki Memorial Golf Tournament annually.

== Natural surroundings ==
The club grounds boast an enviable collection of flowering trees and tropical plants, many of which have been brought from far afield as Australia and South America. These provide a natural sanctuary for a variety of exotic birds. Birds & Trees of Tolly, written by Kushal Mookherjee, explores these in greater detail.

== Facilities ==
=== Food & Beverage ===
- Restaurant
- Bar
- Banquet (Party & Conference)

=== Sporting Facilities ===
- Golf – 18 holes, par 70, 6,304 yards (5,764 m).
- Squash – 4 glass backed indoor courts.
- Tennis – 4 clay courts; 2 hard courts (all outdoor).
- Swimming – 1 Covered pool; 1 outdoor pool; 1 outdoor Jacuzzi
- Riding – Horses and children's ponies available. Riding classes are conducted twice a day.
- Billiards – 2 tables. Also, 1 pool table.
- Health Club – Health and fitness centre with sauna and steam bath.

=== Other Facilities ===
- Bar & Catering – Airconditioned and Outdoor Bars. Indian, Chinese and Continental Cuisine.
- Bridge – Regular Bridge sessions in Bridge Room.
- Cyber Cafe, Conferencing and Banqueting facilities.
- Transcend at the Tolly – A salon in collaboration with L'Oréal Professional, Paris.
- Ayurvedic Spa
- Accommodation – 70 Air-conditioned double suites in Grand Stand, Tolly Towers & Tolly Terrace.
- Food & Beverages – 4 restaurants, 5 bars, Wills Lounge, 3 banquet halls, Kwality Walls ice-cream parlour.
- Spencers Convenience store

== Affiliated clubs ==
- (India) Calcutta Cricket & Football Club (CC&FC)

== See also ==
- List of India's gentlemen's clubs
