= Kudghat =

- Neighbourhood in Kolkata (Calcutta)
- Location in Kolkata Kudghat (West Bengal) Kudghat (India)
- Coordinates: 22.4822°N 88.3461°E
- Country: India
- State: West Bengal
- City: Kolkata
- District: Kolkata
- Metro Station: Netaji
- KMC Ward: 97

Government
  - Type: Municipal Corporation
  - Body: Kolkata Municipal Corporation

Languages
  - Official: Bengali, English
- Time zone: UTC+5:30 (IST)
- PIN: 700040
- Telephone code: +91 33
- Lok Sabha constituency: Jadavpur
- Vidhan Sabha constituency: Tollygunge

Kudghat is a locality of South Kolkata in West Bengal, India. It is a part of Tollygunge area. Adjoined localities are Purba Putiary and Paschim Putiary.

== Geography ==
Kudghat is located on either banks of the Adi Ganga, the main flow of the Hooghly River from the 15th to 17th century connecting Kolkata to the Bidyadhari River to the east. Further deepened by William Tolly for transportation and trade purposes, it has virtually dried up and now serve as a prime drainage outlet during the rainy seasons.

== Transport ==
=== Bus ===
Kudghat has a bus terminal named Kudghat Bus Terminus. A variety of AC & Non-AC Buses depart from this terminus.

- AC-47 Kudghat - Shapoorji
- V-1 Kudghat - Airport
- S-2 Kudghat - Howrah Stn
- NS-16 Kudghat - Barasat
- S-17A Kudghat - Ariadaha
- 208 Kudghat - Howrah Stn

=== Metro ===
The Netaji Metro Station is the first of several to be constructed over the Adi Ganga which stretches on to New Garia as part of the first extension to the network of Kolkata Metro. The naming of the station had given rise to a controversy as no historical evidence has been found showing any link between Netaji Subhash Chandra Bose and the Kudghat area.

== Places of interest ==
=== Northern Side ===
The oldest extant structures in the entire area - four large domed Shiva temples - of which only one is currently in use, is situated in the middle of the northern side. The temples belong to one of the oldest residents in the area, who had moved in hundreds of years ago as landlords. The family still maintains their primary residence beside the temples.

The campus of the Mansur Habibullah Memorial School (MHMS), an English medium, Indian Certificate of Secondary Education board school is situated along the banks of the Adi Ganga. It caters to many students from the area and beyond. The campus was originally a large estate that had served as the ancestral property of the schools namesake, Syed Abul Mansur Habibullah who had been a stalwart in the erstwhile left front government in the state. Habibullah's primary residence, a double storied villa facing the Adi Ganga has been preserved by the school on the far end of the campus.

The road leading to Tollygunge Tram Depot also houses the century-old Movietone studios that has been a pillar of Cinema of West Bengal. The original buildings were destroyed by a devastating in the 1980s and the entire premises were left deserted for the next 20 years. The dilapidated structures were partly replaced beginning 2012 and the premises of the old studio is now the shooting location for a number of television serials primarily distributed on Star Jalsa. Movietone studio, along with the Technician's Studio, New Theatres and Dassani Studio have been integral to the golden age of Bengali cinema in the 'roaring 50s'.

=== Southern Side ===
The Kudghat municipal bazaar, comprising a large vegetable market along with a number of shops selling groceries and sweets. The Kolkata Municipal Corporation announced in 2010 that the sprawling bazaar would be upgraded into a multi storied structure with wider retail spaces for shops, adequate parking facilities as well as a renovated road running through the middle of the area which will end the consistent congestion in the area. Work is yet to begin.

== See also ==
- Kolkata Metro Railway Routes (North South Corridor)
