= Industrial Training Institute, Tollygunge =

Coordinates: 22°29′05.48″N 88°20′37.76″E

Tollygunge Government Industrial Training Institute
- Other names: ITI Tollygunge
- Type: Training College
- Affiliations: West Bengal State Council for Vocational Training
- Location: Tollygunge, Kolkata, West Bengal, India
- Campus: Urban
- Website: iti.wb.gov.in

Tollygunge Government Industrial Training Institute (also known as ITI Tollygunge), established in 1957, is one of the oldest government vocational training institute located in Tollygunge, Kolkata, West Bengal, India.

ITI Tollygunge offers different training courses on Carpenter, Electrician, Fitter, Foundryman, Machinist, Turner, Welder, Wireman, Sheet Metal Worker, Draughtsman (Mechanical), Draughtsman (Civil).
