= G. D. Birla Centre for Education =

G. D. Birla Centre For Education

Location
- 118, N.S.C. Bose Road, Kolkata-700040; India

Information
- Type: Private school
- Established: 1973
- School board: CISCE
- Website: ashokhall.org/GDBIRLA/home.php

G. D. Birla Centre for Education is an CISCE affiliated school in Kolkata. The third-youngest school in the Ashok Hall Group Of Schools (the youngest being Ashok Hall Girls' Higher Secondary School established in 1951 and the second-youngest being Ashok Hall Girls' Residential School in Ranikhet, Uttaranchal founded in 1993), it was founded in 1973 and is named after Ghanshyam Das Birla. The school is located in Ranikuthi near Tollygunge. The school boasts computer, biotech, physics, biology and chemistry laboratories as well as a library. Activities such as western and eastern dance, music, art and craft are encouraged and provided to the junior school students through links with BILAMS. Another subject of the school, Vedic chanting helps the students know more about God and helps them feel refreshed through chanting prayers.

== Controversy ==
On 1 December 2017, two teachers of this school, Abhishek Roy and Md. Mofizul were arrested for sexually assaulting a 4-year-old student of this school. Moreover, it came to be known that the school did not implement an earlier recommendation by CBSE of installing CCTV inside the school. The CBSE circular mentioned, "Any violation or lapses with regard to safety and well being of children in school campus would invite appropriate action including the disaffiliation of the school as per the provisions under affiliation bye-laws of the board."

In 2019, a student died at the school, possibly by suicide. The case drew media attention and the school was investigated by the state's child rights commission for not providing attendants near the girls lavatory.
