= Tollygunge =

- Neighbourhood in Kolkata (Calcutta)
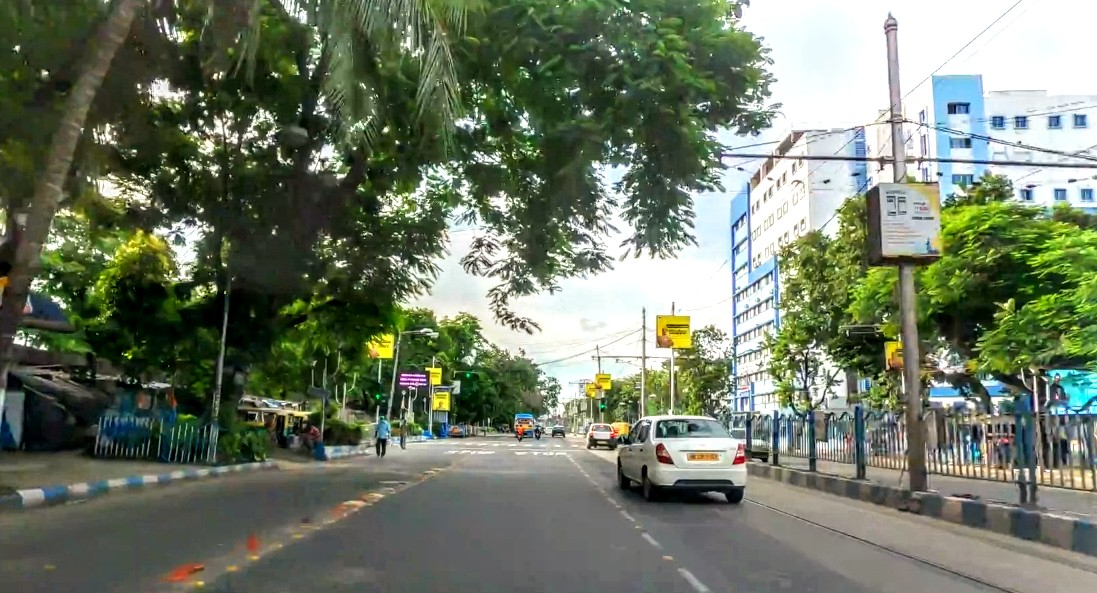

- Location in Kolkata
- Coordinates: 22.498°N 88.346°E
- Country: India
- State: West Bengal
- City: Kolkata
- District: South 24 Parganas
- Metro Station: Rabindra Sarobar; Mahanayak Uttam Kumar; Netaji
- Municipal Corporation: Kolkata Municipal Corporation
- KMC wards: 89, 94, 81, 95, 97, 98 (Added Area)
- Elevation: 36 ft (11 m)

Population
  - Total: For population see linked KMC ward pages
- Time zone: UTC+5:30 (IST)
- PIN: 700033, 700040
- Area code: +91 33
- Lok Sabha constituency: Kolkata South and Jadavpur
- Vidhan Sabha constituency: Rashbehari and Tollygunge

Tollygunge is a locality of South Kolkata, in West Bengal, India. It is known for being the center of Bengali cinema in India, with filming locations used for other regional Indian films.

== Geography ==
=== Location ===
It is flanked by the Eastern Railway south suburban line to the north, Lake Gardens and Golf Green in the east, the Pashchim Putiari and Purba Putiari in the south and Behala in the west. The neighbourhood is served by Mahanayak Uttam Kumar metro station and Netaji metro station of Kolkata Metro.

=== Neighbourhoods ===
Other prominent neighbourhoods in the area include Haridevpur, Kudghat, Ranikuthi, Regent Park, Netaji Nagar and Bansdroni.

=== Places of interest ===
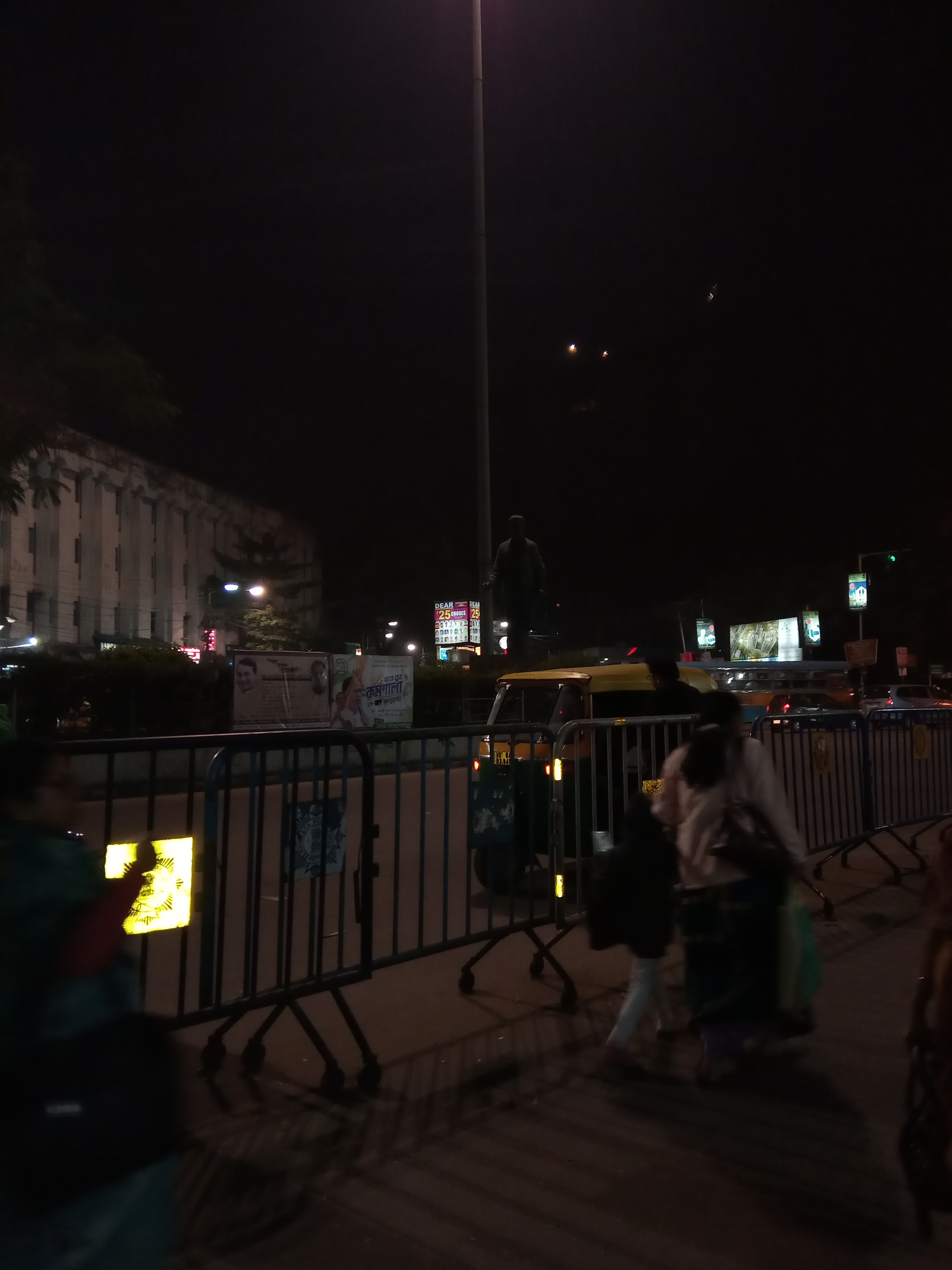
View of statue of Uttam Kumar, a famous Tollywood actor, at night at Tollygunge .

- Other places of Interest in Tollygunge include-
- Tollygunge Agragami
- Tollygunge Club
- Royal Calcutta Golf Club (RCGC)
- ITC Sangeet Research Academy
- Indrapuri Film Studio(now known as Star Studios)

== History ==
In the 18th century, Tollygunge, then known as Rasa Pagla, was a jungle with European garden houses scattered throughout. The Europeans, living in the central areas of old Calcutta, had a craze for villas far out in the sleepy villages, which were emerging as suburbs. It was renamed after Colonel William Tolly, who made the dead Adi Ganga channel navigable in 1774. Tipu Sultan's sons settled down in the area after the Vellore Mutiny in 1806. The British extended their patronage to Tollygunge Club and Tollygunge Golf Club in the 19th century.

In 1888, Ballygunge and Tollygunge formed a common thana when 25 new Police Section Houses were set up. In 1889, the suburbs of Calcutta were divided among 4 municipalities. While a portion of Tollygunge formed the South Suburban Municipality, northern Tollygunge which was part of the earlier Suburban Municipality was made one of the 'added area wards' of Kolkata Municipal Corporation. In 1951, the southern part of Tollygunge was added to Calcutta.

Around 1921, Kolkata Municipal Corporation made efforts in certain areas, and that included Ballygunge-Tollygunge, to widen roads and add sewerage, water supply and other civic benefits.

With the partition of Bengal, "millions of refugees poured in from erstwhile East Pakistan... hundreds of 'refugee colonies' sprang up almost overnight all across the city and occupied all vacant land in the fringe areas. Here the refugees built their very own type of settlement, bearing some reflection of the village set-up of their lost homes... the refugees had taken command of adjoining areas such as Tollyganj and transformed them into a very different environment." The influx of refugees occurred in several spurts between 1947 and 1971. Only a small part of the influx stayed in the government transit camps and the overwhelming majority settled in squatters' colonies along the eastern fringes of the city, starting from Barrackpore in the north, through Dumdum to Jadavpur, Tollygunge and Behala, down to Sonarpur in the south. The massive influx had a major demographic, cultural, economic and political impact on the city.

There is a small red-light district is located near Prince Anwar Shah Road.

== Culture ==
=== Film ===
The area is the centre of the Bengali film industry, which is known by the nickname Tollywood. It is the location of Indrapuri Studio and Technician Studio, a favourite hub for the late director Rituparno Ghosh (who happens to be an alumnus of Jadavpur University, located in neighbouring Jadavpur), Ajoy kar and Tarun Majumdar. There is also the old NH1 studio and now several other new ones have emerged.

With the construction of old Calcutta with various imported styles, the local temple architecture also evolved. Among the temples are the Atchala temples of the Ghosh family built between 1788 and 1807. Prince Ghulam Mohammad built the mosque in Tollygunge in 1830.

=== Literature ===
Tollygunge is the setting among others in the 2013 novel, The Lowland, by Jhumpa Lahiri, who is ethnically from the locality. The novel was placed on the shortlist for the 2013 Man Booker Prize.

== Economy ==
=== Daily markets ===
Lake Market, along with Hatibagan, Maniktala, Sealdah and Gariahat markets, is amongst the largest markets in Kolkata. The larger markets of Kolkata are divided into two sectors – inner and outer. The inner market is the official or core market in a planned building and the outer is a makeshift arrangement of pavement stalls. The Lake Road Market at 104 Rash Behari Avenue is a Kolkata Municipal Corporation market spread over 1.16 acres. Vegetables, fruits, betel leaf, flowers, fish, meat, egg etc. are available. There are several South Indian hotels and restaurants in the area.

The Lake Mall, developed by the Space Group, is a more recent addition. It is a six-story building with a high-end shopping mall, food courts and entertainment.

Charu Chandra Market at 54/1 Charu Chandra Avenue is a private roadside market spread across 0.66 acres. Vegetables, fruits, betel leaf, fish, meat, eggs and grocery are available.

== Education ==
Educational institutions:

- South Academy High School (Near Bansdroni Bazar)
- Maharishi Vidyamandir (Near Bansdroni Fire Brigade)
- G.D.Birla Centre For Education
- Calcutta Institute of Engineering and Management
- Sir Nripendra Nath Institution (SNNI)
- Adarsh Hindi High School
- Bangur High School
- Naktala High School
- Netaji Nagar Vidyamandir
- Swami Pranabananda Vidyapith
- The Assembly of God Church School
- Narmada High School
- Mansur Habibullah Memorial School (Formerly: South End School), Kudghat beside Netaji metro station
- Ashok Nagar Boys High School (co.education)
- Milan Garh Girls High School
- The Future Foundation School
- Industrial Training Institute (ITI Tollygunge)
- Gandhi Colony Madhyamik Vidyalaya (Boys & Girls)
- Tirthapati Institution
- Institute of Mass Communication Film and Television Studies

== Electorate ==
Tollygunge happens to be a Vidhan Sabha constituency in the West Bengal Legislative Assembly and several neighbourhoods in this area like Golf Green, Bijoygarh, Bikramgarh, Azadgarh etc. served as refugee colonies post the 1971 Bangladesh Liberation War. It is currently represented by Aroop Biswas of the All India Trinamool Congress in the Legislative Assembly, who also serves as Minister for North Bengal Development in the Government of West Bengal. Erstwhile Leader of the Opposition in the Assembly, Pankaj Banerjee, preceded Biswas. The first Left Front Mayor of Kolkata, Prasanta Sur, represented Tollygunge in several successive elections. Hence, Tollygunge has a rich and diverse political and socio-economic history. Ambika Chakrabarty and Niranjan Sengupta, had earlier been elected from Tollygunge several number of times within the 1950-70s. Both were veteran fighters of the Bengal Independence movement, having been members of the Chittagong Jugantar Party and the Dhaka Anushilan Samity, respectively. Tollygunge is currently part of the Jadavpur Lok Sabha Constituency, which was represented by famous singer Kabir Suman from 2009 to 2014. Earlier, it fell within the South Kolkata constituency. As per the orders of the Delimitation Commission, Tollygunge Vidhan Sabha Was Composed of Ward No. 89,94,97,98,99 till 1967.89,94,97,98 till 1982. 89,94,95,97,98 till 2001 and 81,89,94,95,97,98 till 2011.From 2011 now comprises the following wards: 94, 95, 97, 98, 100, 111, 112, 113 and 114 of the Kolkata Municipal Corporation.

== Healthcare ==
One of the major government super-speciality hospitals, M.R. Bangur Hospital, is situated in Tollygunge. An ISO-certified hospital it serves as the district hospital for the South 24 Parganas district. M R Bangur caters to the massive population of the district as well as adjoining metropolitan areas. Other important hospitals and nursing homes include - RSV, Bijoygar Government Hospital, Moore Avenue Polly Clinic, Tapan Sinha Memorial Hospital, Swiss Park Nursing Home Private Limited, Tollygunge Medical Hall, Arogya Maternity and Nursing Home, Medline Nursing Home, Apollo Clinic Bansdroni, Silver Line Eye Hospital, Calcutta Lions Netra Niketan, New Bangur Hospital and Cancer Research, Jissan International, Metro Railway Hospital, Tiss Path Lab, among others.

== Transport ==
Tollygunge serves as terminal points of several transport services including the tram, city buses of the Calcutta Tramways company and the metro station.

WBTC Bus

- V-1 (Tollygunge Tram Depot - Airport)
- EB-3 (Tollygunge Tram Depot - Ecospace)
- AC-1 (Jadavpur 8B Bus Stand - Howrah Stn)
- AC-4B (Joka - New Town)
- AC-6 (Garia 6 no Bus stand - Howrah Stn)
- AC-47 (Kudghat - Shapoorji)
- AC-49 (Parnasree - Ecospace)
- C-8 (Joka - Barasat)
- S-2 (Kudghat - Howrah Stn)
- S-3W (Joka - Ecospace)
- S-4 (Parnasree - Karunamoyee)
- S-4C (Haridevpur - Howrah Stn)
- S-7 (Garia 6 no Bus stand - Howrah Stn)
- S-22 (Shakuntala Park - Karunamoyee)
- S-17A (Kudghat - Dakshineswar)

Tollygunge Railway Station is located on the Budge Budge section of the Kolkata Suburban Railway. The Mahanayak Uttam Kumar metro station (formerly Tollygunge) had been a terminal station of the Kolkata Metro from 1984 to 2009. From 2009, the overground extension of the Metro Railway extended the Metro's range to beyond Tollygunge up to New Garia. Hence, if one's office is located in the office para areas of Park Street, Camac Street, or LL Nehru Road, then one can commute through the metro much more conveniently.

The first electric tramcar in Kolkata ran from Esplanade to Khidirpur in 1902, and tracks were laid up to Tollygunge in 1903.

The Calcutta Tramways Company depot in Tollygunge serves as a terminal point for the tram service (which links it to Ballygunge and B.B.D. Bagh by tram routes 24/29 and 29, respectively). The same company also operated some state government buses. Bus services connecting Netaji Subhash Chandra Bose International Airport via New Town pass through it.

The major auto routes are Ranikuthi-Garia More, Ranikuthi-Tollygunge Tram Depot, Ranikuthi-Baghajatin, Ranikuthi-Jadavpur 8B, Tollygunge Tram Depot-Jadavpur 8B and Prince Anwar Shah More-Jadavpur Police Station.

== Notable residents ==
- Ali Muhammad Shibli, anti-colonial revolutionary (born 1879)
- Mark Tully, British Indian Businessman,Born in Tollygunge
- Uttam Kumar
- A. C. Bhaktivedanta Swami Prabhupada, founder of ISKCON
- Utpal Dutt, film actor and theatre personality.
- Sabitri Chatterjee Indian Actress.
- Kalidas Roy, Poet
