= Regent Estate =

Housing estate in Haggerston, London

Coordinates: 51.537287°N 0.066971°W

Regent Estate is a housing estate in Hackney located in the London Borough of Hackney. The estate is named in reference to the nearby Regent's Canal, which was commissioned by the Prince Regent who later became King George IV. It is adjacent to, but distinct from, the Regents Court Estate.

== Housing ==
The estate comprises council housing built in the late 1970s and early 1980s and owned or by the London Borough of Hackney. The estate is a mix of terraced houses, purpose-built flats in smaller blocks, with 3 large blocks of flats on Broke Walk, Marlborough Avenue and an additional block on Brownlow Road that was included as part of the estate in 2006. As terraced houses have been sold under the right to buy scheme, this has resulted in a mixed ownership of freeholders, long leaseholders, council tenants and Housing Association tenants.

== Facilities ==
The estate has three community buildings: The Regent Estate Community Centre/Hall, The Regent Estate Pensions Club/Hall and The Regent Estate Community Office. The latter is used by Hackney Homes Cleaning Services. The estate is served by the Ozen Supermarket.

The estate houses the Workshop 44 gallery, based in a shop space which stood shuttered up for over a decade. After petitioning by the Tenants and Residents Association and with the help of Hackney Homes Residents Participation office, and the London Olympics Arts in Derelict Spaces funding the space was turned into a multimedia arts gallery run by Rolemop. Clear Village were then invited to perform a study for the estate and then also took over the management of the shop as Clear Villages first Small Works initiative.
