= Gadiara =

- village
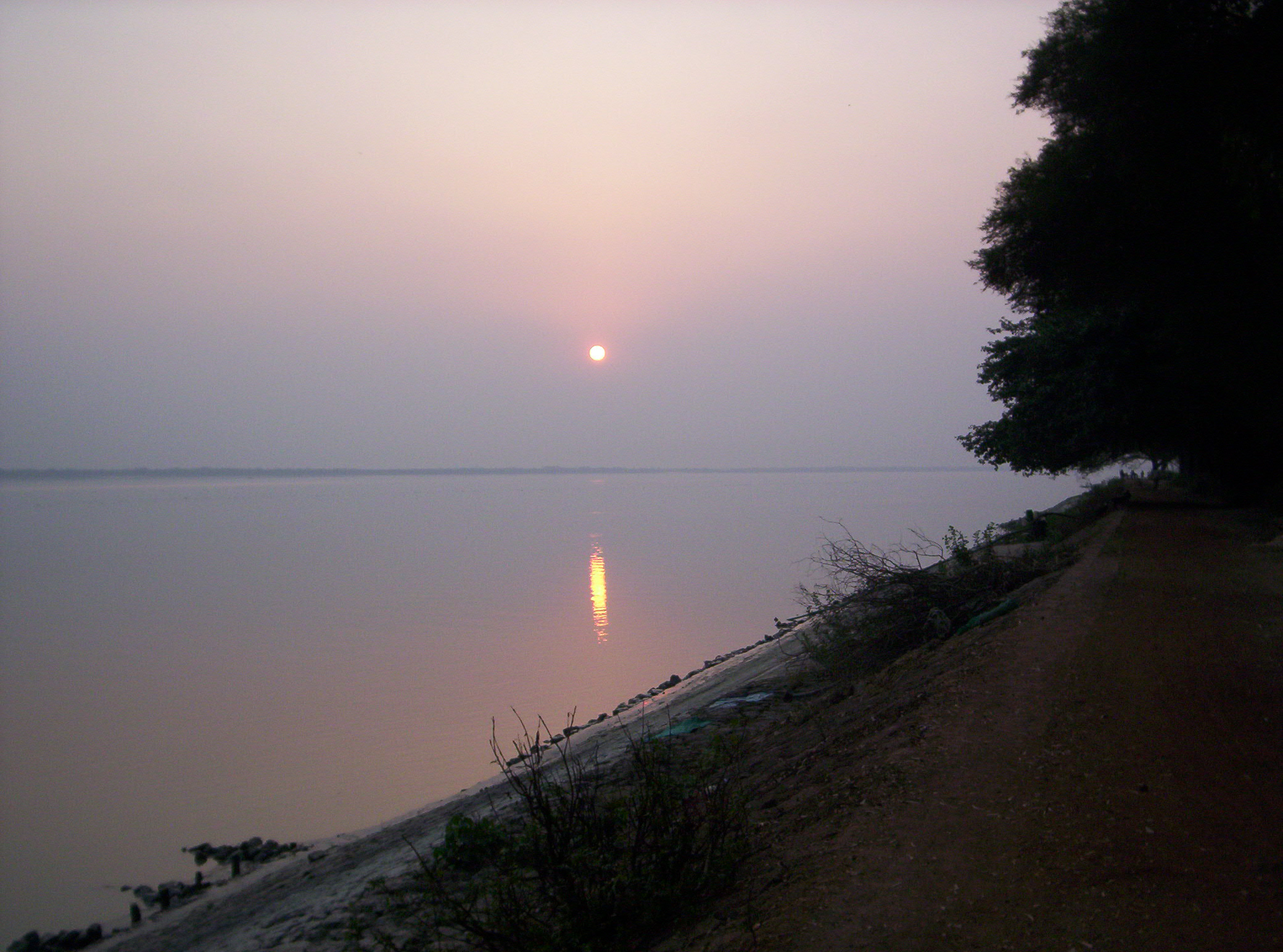
- Sunset at Gadiara

- Location in West Bengal, India Gadiara (India)
- Coordinates: 22.22°N 88.05°E
- Country: India
- State: West Bengal
- District: Howrah

Government
  - Body: Gram panchayat

Languages
  - Official: Bengali, English
- Time zone: UTC+5:30 (IST)
- Vehicle registration: WB
- Nearest city: Howrah, Kolkata
- Lok Sabha constituency: Uluberia
- Vidhan Sabha constituency: Shyampur
- Website: howrah.gov.in

Gadiara is a village in the Howrah District of West Bengal, India. It is the point of confluence of the Rupnarayan and the Hoogli river.

== Details ==
Gadiara is near 100 km from Kolkata. Gadiara is a popular picnic and daytrip spot for locals and tourists alike. Gadiara has an old fort, Fort Mornington, which was built by Lord Clive; it was heavily damaged during flooding in 1942. There is a lighthouse in Gadiara. Top 10 picnic spot of Howrah District. Here having a Govt Tourist Lodge named Rupnarayan Tourist Lodge and famous musical themes resorts like Jaltaranga Eco resort, Gadiara.
