= William Tolly =

Colonel William Tolly (1715–1784) was an officer of the British East India Company, who later settled down in Calcutta, noted for creating Tolly's Nullah.

== Life-sketch ==
He served as officer of British East India Company and retired as a colonel. He settled down near Calcutta and decided to dig out an old channel of Adi Ganga (a branch of Hooghly River) at his own cost to make it navigable for ships. This canal (nullah) was dug out by him between 1775 and 1776, before becoming operational in 1777. The channel later came to be known as Tolly's Nullah. He de-silted, deepened and opened this old channel as a water way connecting the Calcutta Port to the rivers of the eastern Bengal, such as Bidyadhari and Matla, making it a part of Calcutta and Eastern Canals, extending over a length of 1,127 miles, of which 47 miles was Tolly's Nullah. Thus making the hinterland of Districts of Bengal and Eastern Bengal and Assam connect with Port of Calcutta. He was given the lease of the canal and some adjacent lands along with the right to collect the toll from the ships using this canal by the company. He also built a market (Ganj), which came to be known as Tollygunj. He also purchased Belvedere area of Calcutta from Warren Hastings, the first Governor-General of Bengal in 1780 and built his mansion there. He is sometimes referred to as the Ferdinand de Lesseps of Calcutta.

He died in 1784.

== Memorials ==
At present Tolly's Nullah and Tollygunj area of Kolkata bear his name as a memorial to him.
