= Ranikuthi =

- Neighbourhood in Kolkata (Calcutta)
- Location in Kolkata
- Coordinates: 22.4842°N 88.3543°E
- Country: India
- State: West Bengal
- City: Kolkata
- District: Kolkata
- Metro Station: Mahanayak Uttam Kumar and Masterda Surya Sen
- Municipal Corporation: Kolkata Municipal Corporation
- KMC ward: 98

Population
  - Total: For population see linked KMC pages
- Time zone: UTC+5:30 (IST)
- PIN: 700 040
- Area code: +91 33
- Lok Sabha constituency: Jadavpur
- Vidhan Sabha constituency: Tollyganj

Ranikuthi is a locality of South Kolkata in West Bengal, India. It is a part of Tollygunge area.
