= Kidderpore =

Khidderpore
- Neighbourhood in Kolkata (Calcutta)
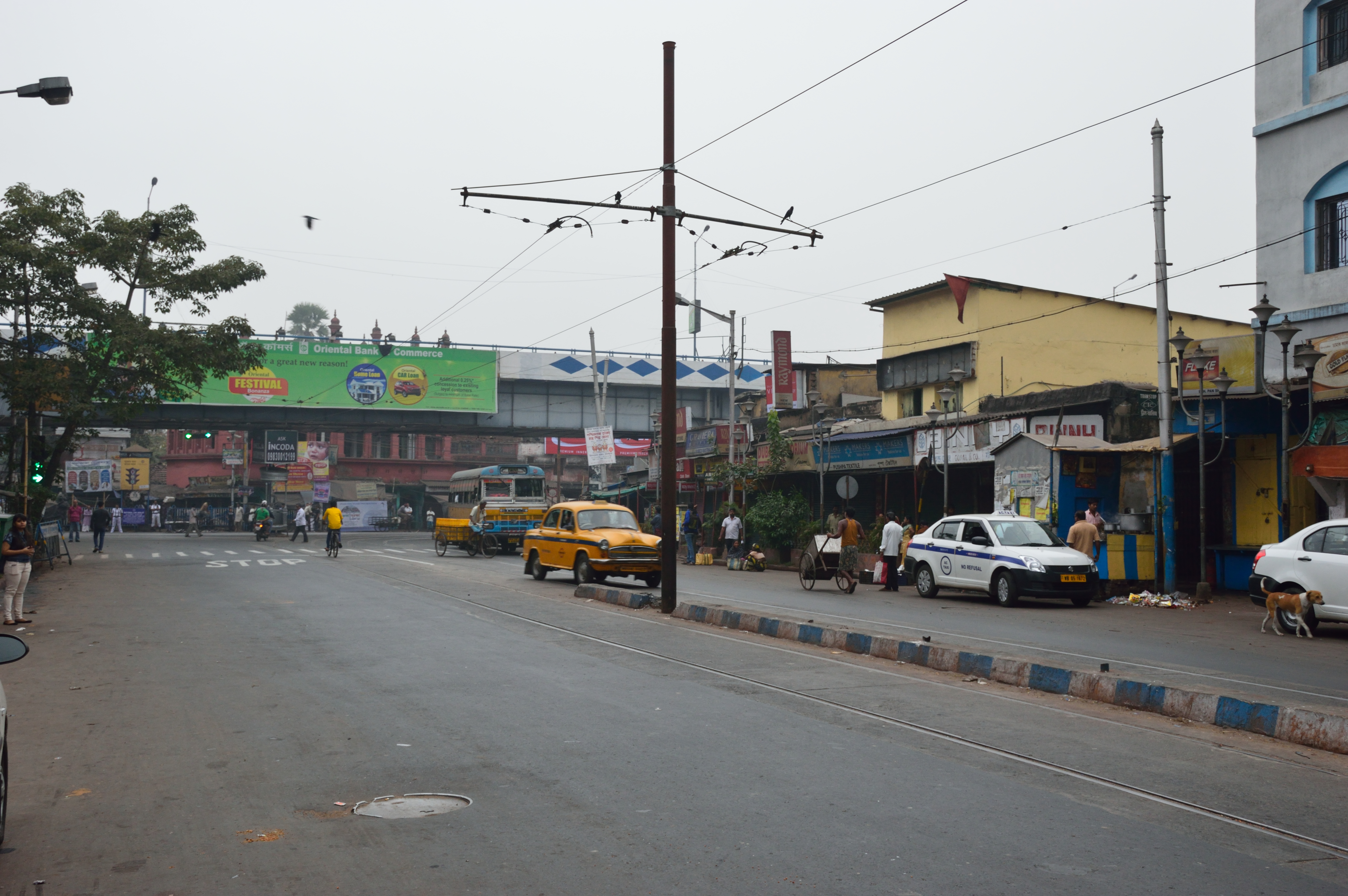
- Karl Marx Sarani and D.H Road Junction

- Location within Kolkata
- Coordinates: 22.536323°N 88.316654°E
- Country: India
- State: West Bengal
- City: Kolkata
- District: Kolkata
- Municipal Corporation: Kolkata Municipal Corporation
- KMC wards: 74, 75, 76, 77, 78, 79, 80
- Elevation: 30 ft (9 m)
- Time zone: UTC+5:30 (IST)
- Area code: +91 33
- Lok Sabha constituency: Kolkata Dakshin
- Vidhan Sabha constituency: Kolkata Port and Bhabanipur

Khidderpore is a neighbourhood of South Kolkata in Kolkata district in the Indian state of West Bengal.

== Etymology ==
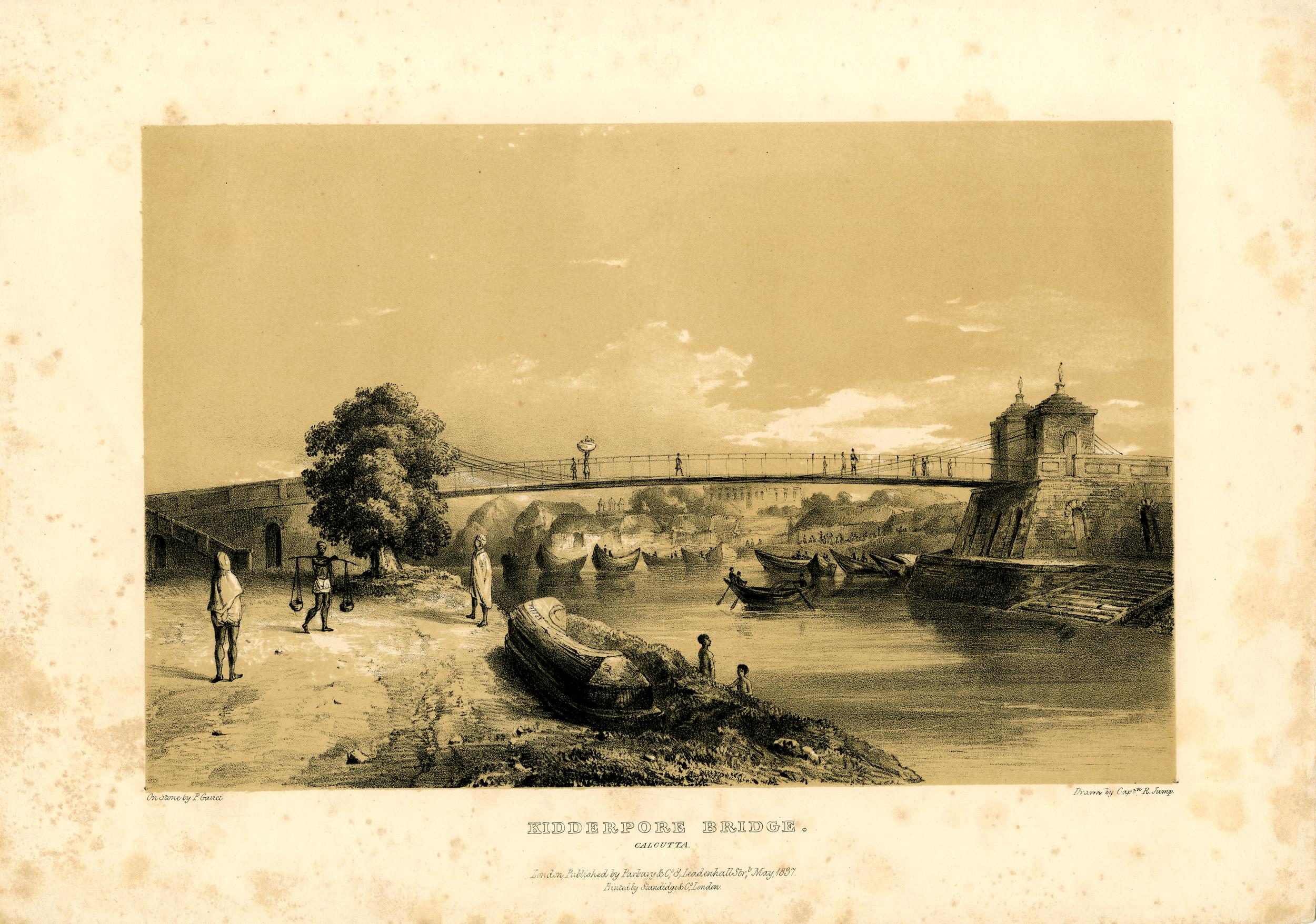
Kidderpore Bridge

St Stephens Cemetery of Kidderpore

The port got its name from James Kyd, a 19th-century engineer who designed and supervised the building of the lock gate that connects the nearby port to the Hooghly River.

== History ==
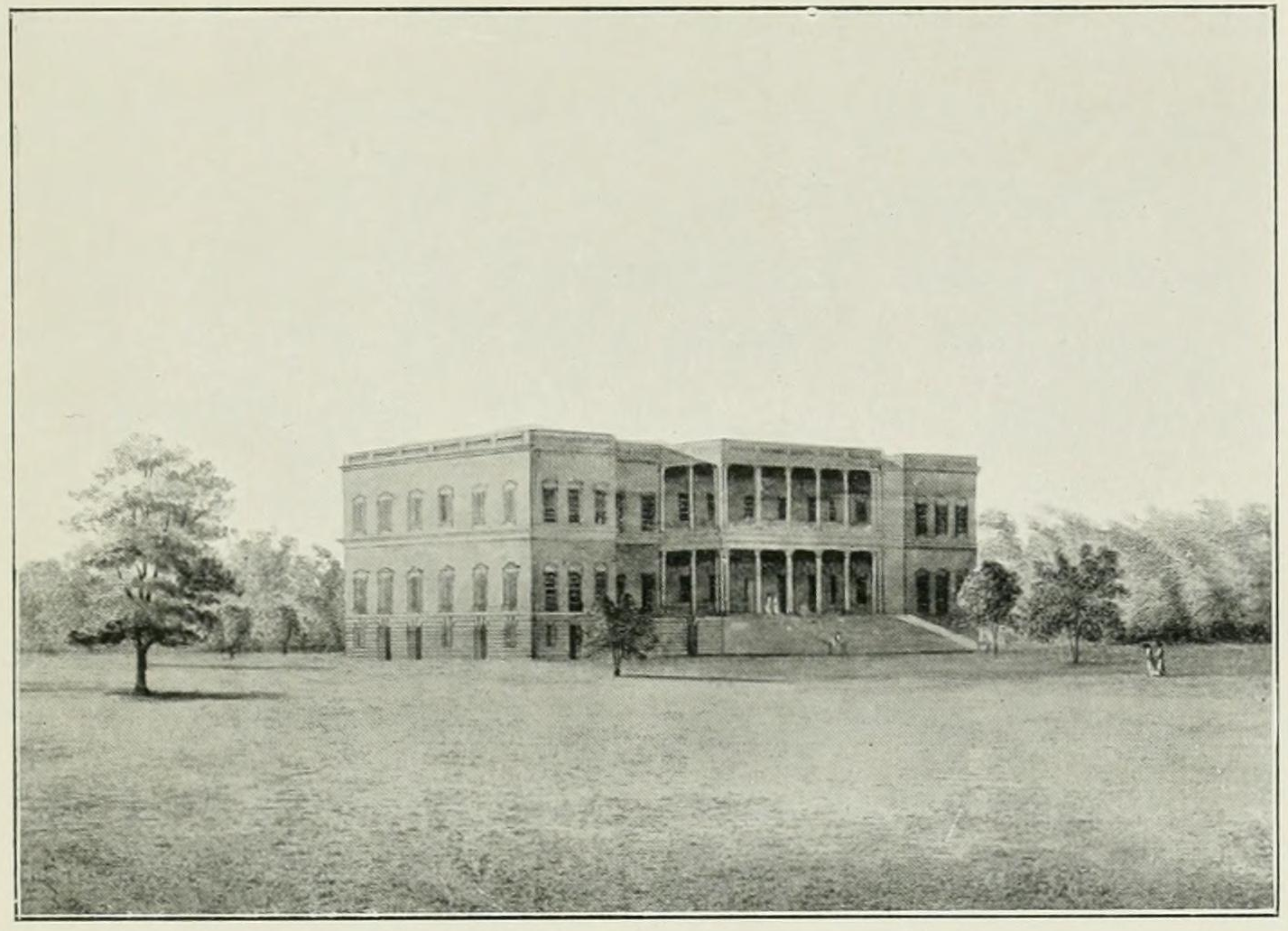
Painting of Kidderpore House by Kathleen Blechynden, Calcutta, Past & Present.

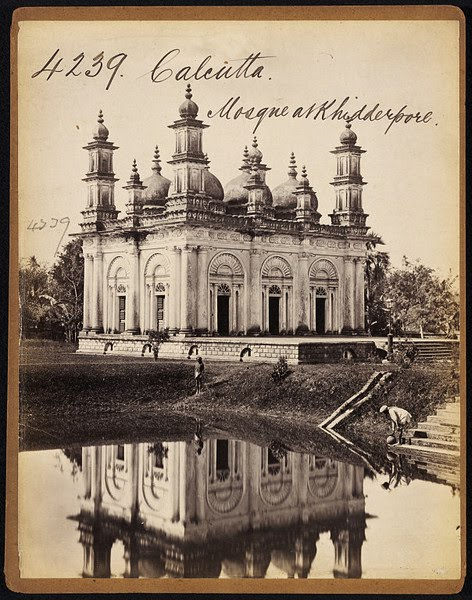
Mosque at Khidderpore, photographed by Francis Frith.

Even after the British had set up their settlements in Kalikata, Sutanuti and Gobindapur, many independent zamindars survived till 1757. They held large landed properties in Gobindapur and elsewhere. When the Gobindapur area was cleared for the construction of the new Fort William, they had to be given alternative land elsewhere: Debs in Shobhabazar, the Thakurs in Pathuriaghata and Jorasanko, and the Ghosals in Bhukailas (Kidderpore). Gokul Ghoshal, the founder of the Bhukailas zemindar family, who was dewan of Harry Verest, left Gobindapur and built a palatial rajbati in Kidderpore and named it Bhukailas.

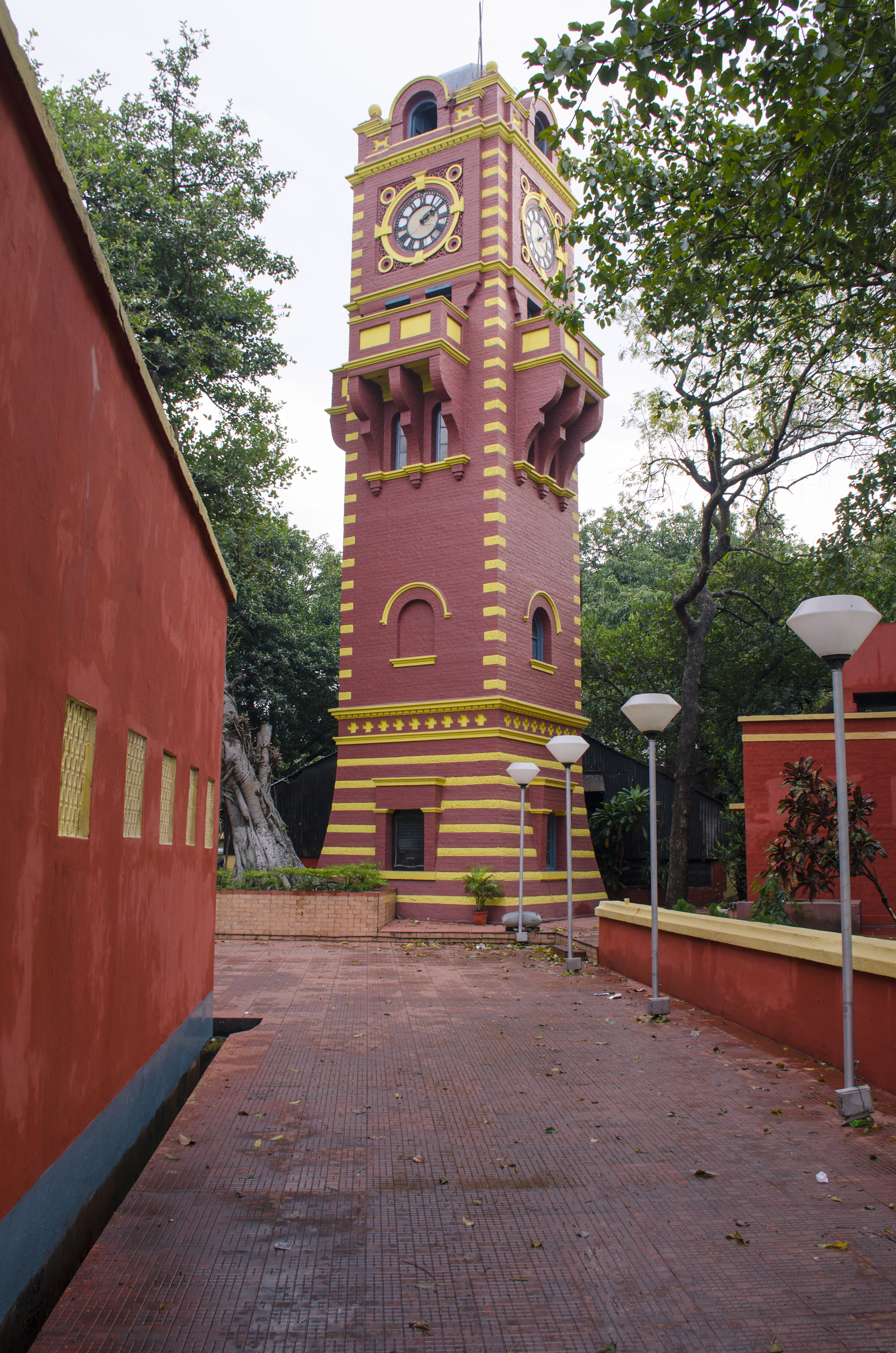
Clock Tower of Kidderpore Dock

In earlier days, thanas (police stations) also looked after the civic needs of the people. The earliest list of thanas in old Kolkata was prepared in 1785 and in 1888. These thanas were regrouped under 25 Police Section Houses. The 25 wards created under the Calcutta Municipal Act of 1889, precisely matched these divisions. In this area there were two Police Section Houses – at Watgunge and Ekbalpur. (Note: For full list of Police Section Houses, see Dihi Panchannagram)

Writing in 1909, H.E.A. Cotton mentions, "Kidderpore, which lies to the west of Alipore, is extensively populated principally by natives."

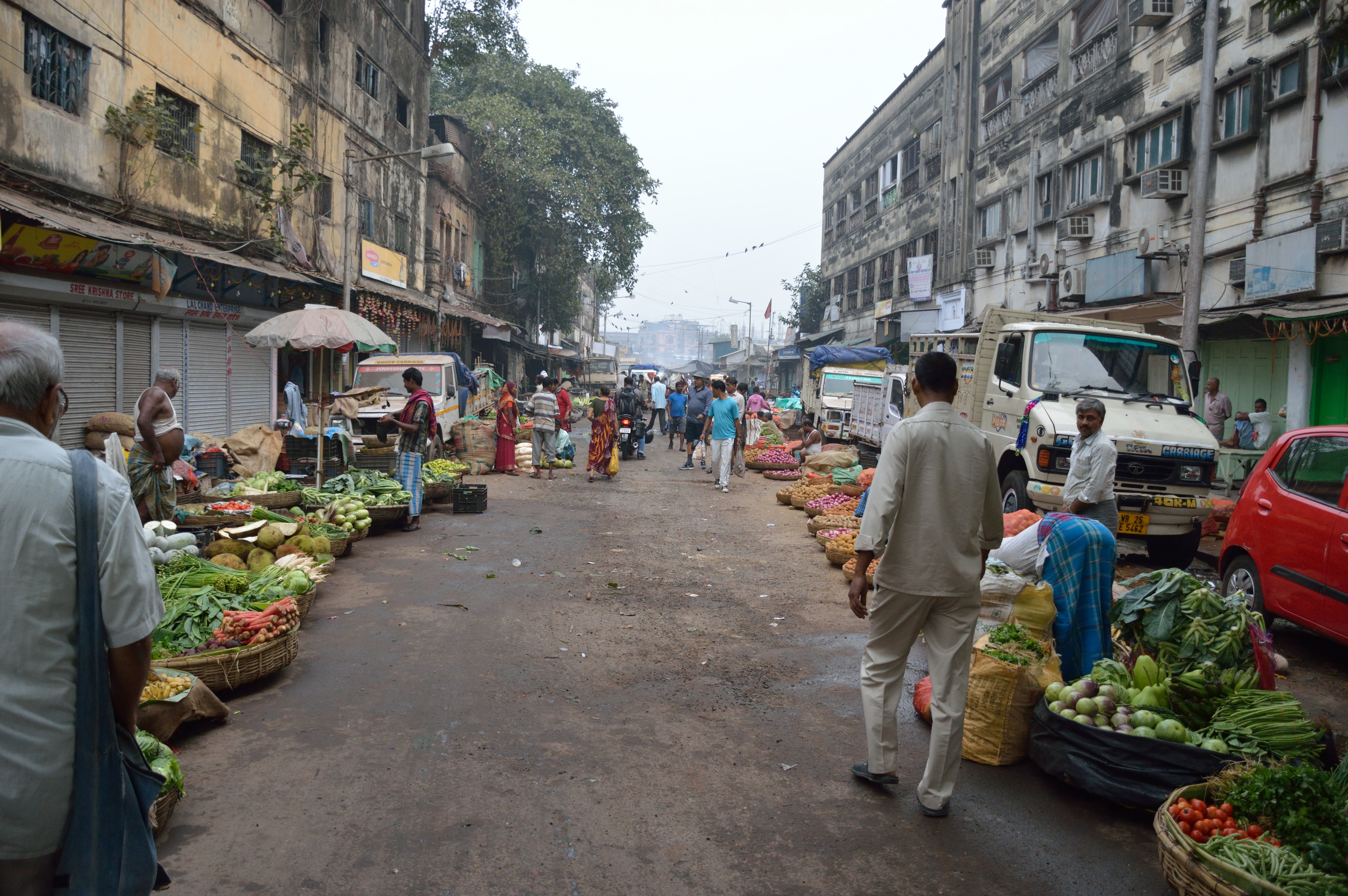
Kidderpore market

In the early years of British rule, Kolkata port was a river anchorage where sailing ships would load and unload in mid-stream. The shore-based Calcutta jetties, with cranes and sheds, came into operation in 1869. In 1884, Kidderpore was selected as the site for the wet docks of the Port of Kolkata, and it was ready in 1892. King George (later renamed Netaji Subhas) Dock was added in 1928. Haldia Dock System is part of Kolkata port. Its first unit, Haldia oil jetty, was commissioned in 1969. Kolkata port was the premier port of India till the early 1950s. In 1950–51, out of the total traffic of 19.3 MT at all the major ports of the country, Kolkata handled 7.6 MT. In 1988–89, Kolkata handled 14.22 MT against 142 MT of all ports taken together. Calcutta Jetties were closed down in 1965–66. Garden Reach jetties have also been closed down. The total labour force of the port declined from 42,946 in 1967 to 25,761 in 1990. A red-light district has grown up near the port.

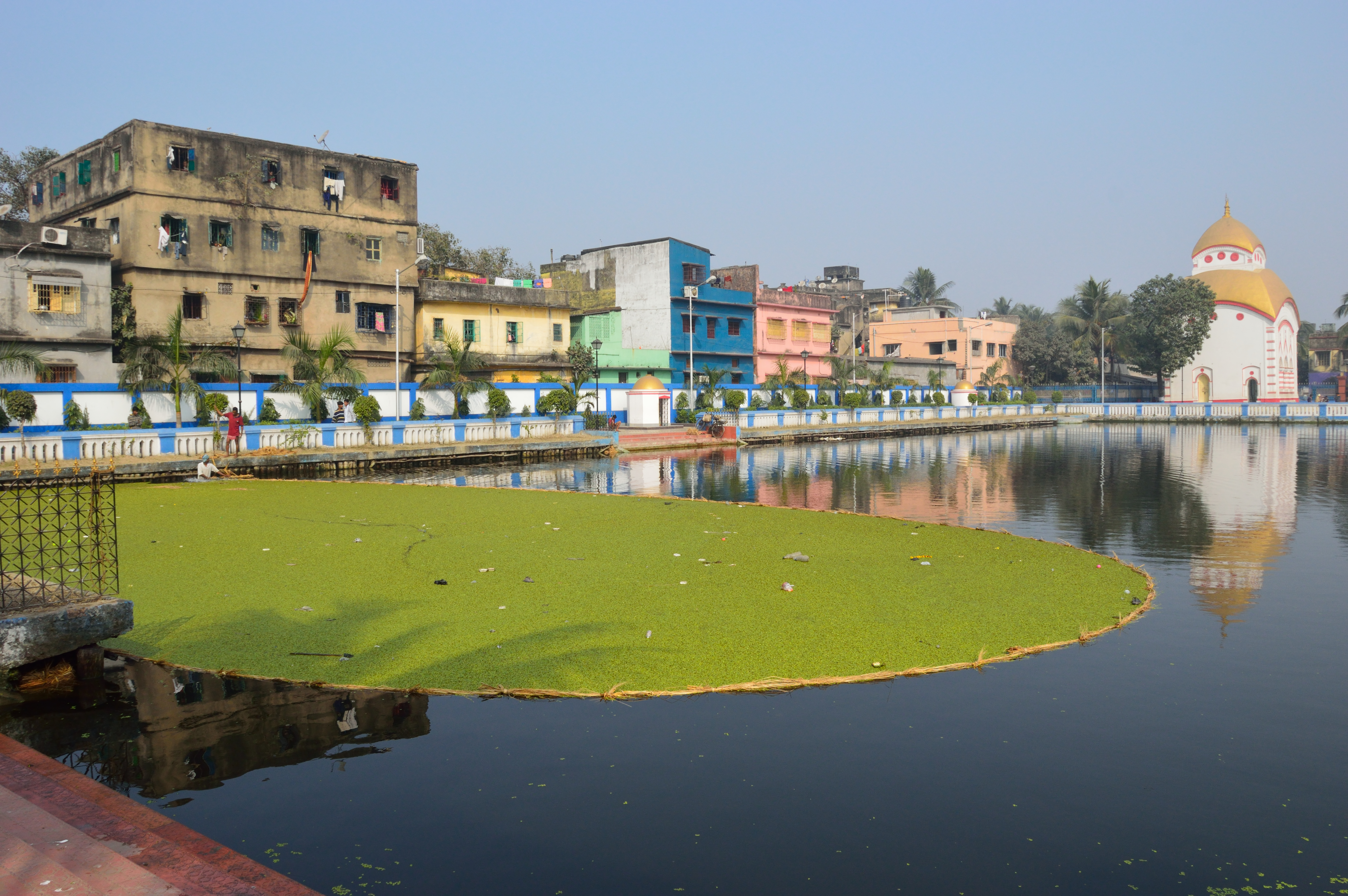
Bhukailash Rajbati Estate in Kidderpore

In the field of Indian literature, this part of Kolkata produced three noted poets: Rongolal Bandhopadhyay, Hemchandra Bandopadhyay, and Michael Madhushudan Dutta. Michael Madhusudan Dutt (1824–1873) was born at Sagordari in Jessore District (now in Bangladesh), and came to Kolkata at the age of 7. After studying initially at Kidderpore School, he joined Hindu College in 1933. However, after converting to Christianity, his relations with his father was strained.

It has been listed as a notorious market since 2019 by the USTR for selling counterfeit electronics, cosmetics, apparel, and pirated media.

== Geography ==
Kidderpore, located in the central-west part of the city, is bounded by the Alipore in the east, Mominpur in the south, Hastings in the north and Garden Reach in the west.

== Transport ==
Kidderpore Bridge is one of the few bridges in Kolkata that has trams plying across it. The Kidderpore Tram Depot connects locations like Kalighat, Tollygunge and Ballygunge etc. The main Kidderpore intersection is connected with northern, southern and central Kolkata by various private and state bus services. Kidderpore can also be accessed by the Kolkata Circular Railway, which has a station in the locality.

The Kolkata Metro Line 3 will pass through Khidderpore and will have an underground station of the same name. It will connect Joka with Esplanade.

== Educational institutions ==
- St Thomas School, Kolkata, this girls and boys school was established in 1789, and is one of the oldest and largest schools in the city.
- Lajpat Hindi High School, is a school located at Kidderpore, Kolkata, India. This is a Hindi-medium boys' school and is affiliated to the West Bengal Board of Secondary Education for Madhyamik Pariksha (10th Board exams), and to the West Bengal Council of Higher Secondary Education for Higher Secondary Examination (12th Board exams).[1] The school was established in 1951.
- Loyola High School, the Institution was established in the year 1961 by the Roman Catholic Archdiocese for the religious and linguistic minorities.
- Maulana Azad Urdu High Schooll, Founded by Dr Ali Sher Khan MA B.Ed PHD (CU) in the year 1973 for the educationally backward and downtrodden students of the locality to counter the lack of educational institutions for the minority community. This institution provides a wonderful opportunity to the economically weaker section of the society.
- Maulana Azad Educational Library- Founded by Dr Ali Sher Khan in the year 1979 in memory of his father Late Md Syeed Khan. This Library was registered and sponsored by the Govt of West Bengal in the year 1981. This library has abundance of books for every kind of book lovers in the neighborhood. This is an institution of Maulana Azad Educational Trust.
- St Teresa Secondary school at 72, Diamond Harbour Road, Kidderpore, Kolkata 700023. Currently affiliated to the ICSE board, the school was established in 1885 and named after Marie Thérèse Haze. Haze decided to respond to the lack of education in her homeland, Belgium, in the chaos resulting from the French Revolution and made that the focus of her religious apostolate; she served as her order's Superior General from its founding until her death. This school is dedicated towards the cause of educating young girls of Kolkata.
- Kidderpore Academy
- Sharat Chandra Pal Girls Higher Secondary School.
- KIdderpore Bankim Chandra Ghose Memorial girls Higher Secondary School.
- St. Barnabas High Secondary School.
- Kidderpore College
- St. Thomas Engineering College
- Malaviya Vidyalaya at 16, Hem Chandra Street, Kolkata 700023 is a Hindi medium, government aided Co-educational school affiliated to West Bengal Board of Primary Education (WBBPE) established in the year 1955 in the memory of 'Mahamana' Pandit Madan Mohan Malaviya. The school has classes from Lower Pre Primary up to standard V and provides all amenities for modern educational needs such as Library, Computer Laboratory and playing area.
- Michael Madhusudan Library is a 103 years old library at Khidirpur.
- Hem Chandra Library is a 105 years old library at Khidirpur.
- Shri Shanti Niketan Vidyalaya located at Daighat (ghat popular for Ganga Aarti (every sunday) & Chathh Puja (festival visited by Chief Minister of West Bengal every year)
- Evergreen High School at 12B Ibrahim Road
- Jawaharlal Nehru Balika Vidyapith at 5/2, Bhukailash Road, Kolkata - 700 023

== See also ==
- Garden Reach
- Port of Kolkata
