= Fazle Azim Molla =

Indian politician

Fazle Azim Molla (Bengali: ফজলে আজিম মোল্লা) was an Indian politician and educationist. He was a Member of the West Bengal Legislative Assembly from the Garden Reach Assembly constituency since 1987 to 1996. He was associated with the Indian National Congress.

Molla established Matiabruj Girls High School in 1966.
