= Watgunge =

- Neighbourhood in Kolkata (Calcutta)
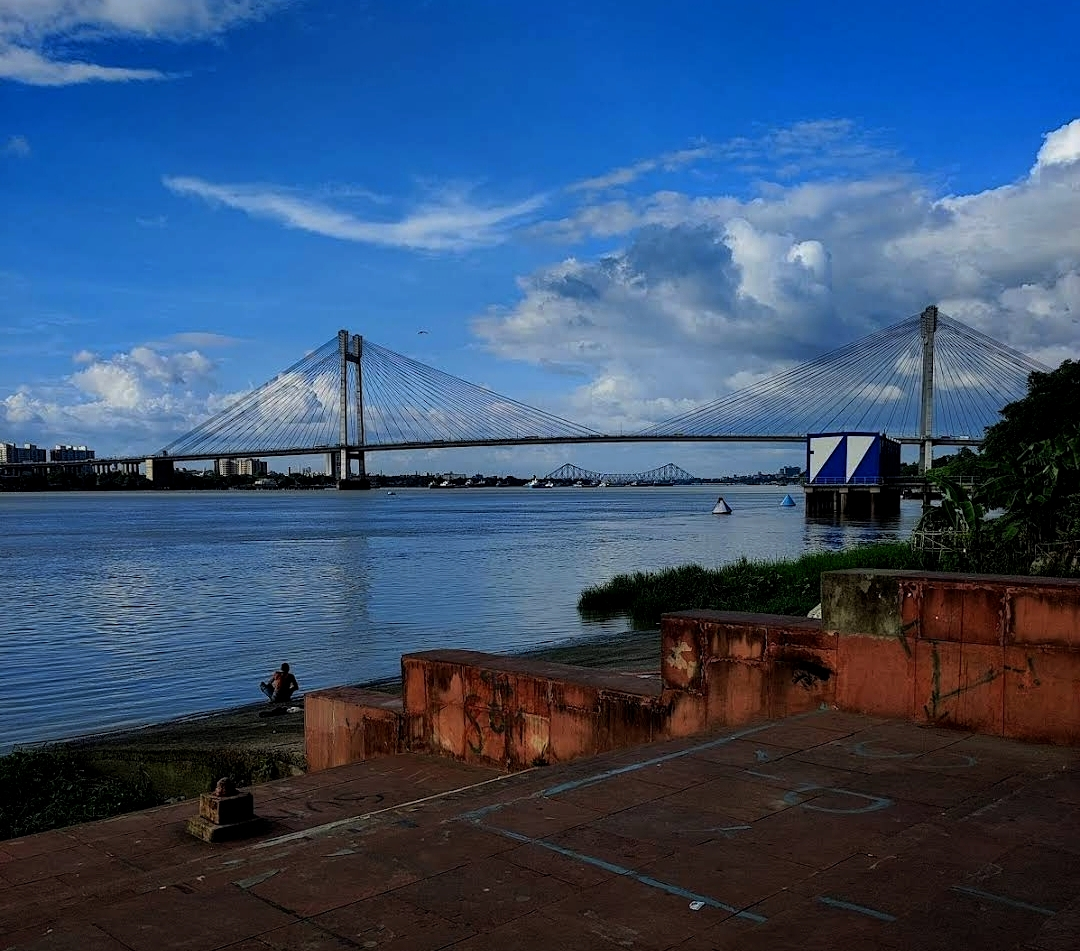
- Doi Ghat, Watgunge

- Location in Kolkata
- Coordinates: 22.548323°N 88.323654°E
- Country: India
- State: West Bengal
- City: Kolkata
- District: Kolkata
- Municipal Corporation: Kolkata Municipal Corporation
- KMC ward: 74, 75, 76

Population
  - Total: For population see linked KMC ward page
- Time zone: UTC+5:30 (IST)
- Area code: +91 33
- Lok Sabha constituency: Kolkata Dakshin
- Vidhan Sabha constituency: Kolkata Port

Watganj or Watgunge is a neighbourhood of South Kolkata in Kolkata district in the Indian state of West Bengal.

== Etymology ==
Watgunge is named after Colonel Henry Watson (1737–1786), who set up the first dockyard in Bengal.

== History ==
Colonel Watson started building the shipbuilding docks in 1779 in the present Watgunge area.

Watgunge was included in the Kolkata municipal area in 1888.

In 1888, one of the 25 newly organized police section houses was located in Watgunge.

== Geography ==
=== Police district ===
Watgunge police station is part of the Port division of Kolkata Police. It is located at 16 Watgunge Street, Kolkata-700023.

Watgunge Women police station, located at the same address as above, covers all police districts under the jurisdiction of the Port division i.e. North Port, South Port, Watgunge, West Port, Garden Reach, Ekbalpur, Nadial, Rajabagan and Metiaburuz.
