= Shyampukur Assembly constituency =

Constituency of the West Bengal Legislative Assembly, in India

Shyampukur
- Constituency No. 166 for the West Bengal Legislative Assembly
- Interactive Map Outlining Shyampukur Assembly Constituency

Constituency details
- Country: India
- Region: East India
- State: West Bengal
- District: Kolkata
- Lok Sabha constituency: Kolkata Uttar
- Established: 1951
- Total electors: 176,368
- Reservation: None

Member of Legislative Assembly
- 18th West Bengal Legislative Assembly
- Incumbent Purnima Chakraborty
- Party: Bharatiya Janata Party
- Elected year: 2026

Shyampukur Assembly constituency is a Legislative Assembly constituency of Kolkata district in the Indian state of West Bengal.

== Overview ==
As per order of the Delimitation Commission in respect of the Delimitation of constituencies in the West Bengal, Shyampukur Assembly constituency is composed of the following:

- Ward Nos. 7, 8, 9, 10, 17, 18, 19, 20, 21, 24 and 26 of Kolkata Municipal Corporation.

Borough	Ward No.	Councillor	2021 Winner
I	7	Bapi Ghosh	Trinamool Congress
I	8	Pooja Panja	Trinamool Congress
I	9	Mitali Saha	Trinamool Congress
II	10	Subrata Banerjee	Trinamool Congress
II	17	Mohan Kumar Gupta	Trinamool Congress
II	18	Sunanda Sarkar	Trinamool Congress
II	19	Shikha Saha	Trinamool Congress
II	20	Vijay Upadhyay	Trinamool Congress
IV	21	Mira Hazra	Trinamool Congress
IV	24	Ellora Saha	Trinamool Congress
IV	26	Tarak Nath Chattopadhyay	Trinamool Congress

Shyampukur Assembly constituency is part of No. 24 Kolkata Uttar Lok Sabha constituency.

== Members of the Legislative Assembly ==
Election Year	Name of M.L.A.	Party affiliation
1952	Hemanta Kumar Basu	All India Forward Bloc
1957	Hemanta Kumar Basu	All India Forward Bloc
1962	Hemanta Kumar Basu	All India Forward Bloc
1967	G.C. Dey	Indian National Congress
1969	Hemanta Kumar Basu	All India Forward Bloc
1971	Vacant	
1972	Barid Baran Das	Indian National Congress
1977	Nalini Kanta Guha	All India Forward Bloc
1982	Kiron Chowdhury	Indian National Congress
1987	Kiron Chowdhury	Indian National Congress
1991	Santi Ranjan Ganguly	All India Forward Bloc
1996	Santi Ranjan Ganguly	All India Forward Bloc
2001	Subrata Bose	All India Forward Bloc
Bye-election, 2004	Jiban Prakash Saha	All India Forward Bloc
2006	Jiban Prakash Saha	All India Forward Bloc
2011	Dr. Shashi Panja	Trinamool Congress
2016	Dr. Shashi Panja	Trinamool Congress
2021	Dr. Shashi Panja	Trinamool Congress
2026	Purnima Chakraborty	Bharatiya Janata Party

== Election results ==
=== 2026 ===
2026 West Bengal Legislative Assembly election: Shyampukur
Party	Candidate	Votes	%	±%
BJP	Purnima Chakraborty	60,248	51.6	+19.29
AITC	Dr. Shashi Panja	45,615	39.06	−15.12
AIFB	Jhuma Das	7,356	6.3	−4.22
INC	Purna Ghosh	1,136	0.97	
NOTA	None of the above	942	0.81	−0.22
Majority		14,633	12.54	−9.33
Turnout		116,768	88.53	+30.21
BJP gain from AITC		Swing		

=== 2021 ===
2021 West Bengal Legislative Assembly election: Shyampukur
Party	Candidate	Votes	%	±%
AITC	Shashi Panja	55,785	54.18	
BJP	Sandipan Biswas	33,265	32.31	
AIFB	Jiban Prakash Saha	10,828	10.52	
NOTA	None of the above	1,063	1.03	
Majority		22,520	21.87	
Turnout		102,970	58.32	
AITC hold		Swing		

=== 2016 ===
2016 West Bengal Legislative Assembly election: Shyampukur
Party	Candidate	Votes	%	±%
AITC	Dr. Shashi Panja	53,507	45.80	−12.17
AIFB	Piyali Pal	40,352	34.54	−1.93
BJP	Somabrata Mandal	18,378	15.73	+12.07
None of the Above	None of the Above	2,700	2.31	New
SUCI(C)	Subir Samanta	619	0.53	
Majority		13,155	11.26	−10.24
Turnout		1,16,816	68.30	+0.63
AITC hold		Swing	-12.17	

=== 2011 ===
2011 West Bengal Legislative Assembly election: Shyampukur
Party	Candidate	Votes	%	±%
AITC	Dr. Shashi Panja	72,904	57.97	
AIFB	Jiban Prakash Saha	45,868	36.47	
BJP	Ganesh Kumar Dhanania	4,598	3.66	
IND	Sushil Kumar Roy	575	0.46	
Majority		27,036	21.50	
Turnout		1,25,766	67.67	
AITC win				
