= Titagarh Assembly constituency =

Coordinates: 22.74°N 88.37°E

Titagarh
- Former constituency No. 133 for the West Bengal Legislative Assembly

Constituency details
- Country: India
- Region: East India
- State: West Bengal
- District: North 24 Parganas
- Lok Sabha constituency: Barrackpore
- Established: 1951
- Abolished: 2011
- Reservation: None

Titagarh Assembly constituency was an assembly constituency in North 24 Parganas district in the Indian state of West Bengal.

== Overview ==
As a consequence of the orders of the Delimitation Commission, while Barrackpur Assembly constituency comes into existence in 2011, Titagarh Assembly constituency ceases to exist from the same year.

Titagarh Assembly constituency was part of 15. Barrackpore (Lok Sabha constituency).

== Members of the Legislative Assembly ==
Election Year	Name of M.L.A.	Party affiliation
1951	Krishna Kumar Shukla	Indian National Congress
1957	Krishna Kumar Shukla	Indian National Congress
1962	Krishna Kumar Shukla	Indian National Congress
1967	Krishna Kumar Shukla	Indian National Congress
1969	Mohammed Amin	Communist Party of India (Marxist)
1971	Mohammad Amin	Communist Party of India (Marxist)
1972	Mohammad Amin	Communist Party of India (Marxist)
1977	Mohammad Amin	Communist Party of India (Marxist)
1982	Ganga Prasad Shaw	Indian National Congress
1987	Ganga Prasad Shaw	Indian National Congress
1991	Dr. Pravin Kumar Shaw	Communist Party of India (Marxist)
1996	Dr. Pravin Kumar Shaw	Communist Party of India (Marxist)
2001	Dr. Pravin Kumar Shaw	Communist Party of India (Marxist)
2006	Dr. Pravin Kumar Shaw	Communist Party of India (Marxist)

Note: For MLAs from the area in subsequent years see Barrackpore Assembly constituency

== Election results ==
=== 1977–2006 ===
In the 2006, 2001, 1996 and 1991 state assembly elections Dr. Pravin Kumar Shaw of CPI(M) won the 133 Titagarh assembly seat defeating Meena Ghosh of Trinamool Congress in 2006, Ashok Shukla of Trinamool Congress in 2001 and Congress in 1996, and Ganga Prasad Saha of Congress in 1991. Ganga Prasad Show of Congress defeated Mohammed Amin of CPI (M) in 1987 and 1982. Mohammed Amin of CPI (M) defeated Ganga Prasad Shaw of Congress in 1977.

=== 1951–1972 ===
Mohammed Amin of CPI(M) won in 1972, 1971 and 1969. Krishna Kumar Shukla of Congress won in 1967, 1962, 1957 and in independent India’s first election in 1951.
