= Kolkata Port Assembly constituency =

Constituency of the West Bengal Legislative Assembly, in India

Kolkata Port
- Constituency No. 158 for the West Bengal Legislative Assembly
- Interactive Map Outlining Kolkata Port Assembly Constituency

Constituency details
- Country: India
- Region: East India
- State: West Bengal
- District: Kolkata
- Lok Sabha constituency: Kolkata Dakshin
- Established: 2011
- Total electors: 171,615 (2026)
- Reservation: None

Member of Legislative Assembly
- 18th West Bengal Legislative Assembly
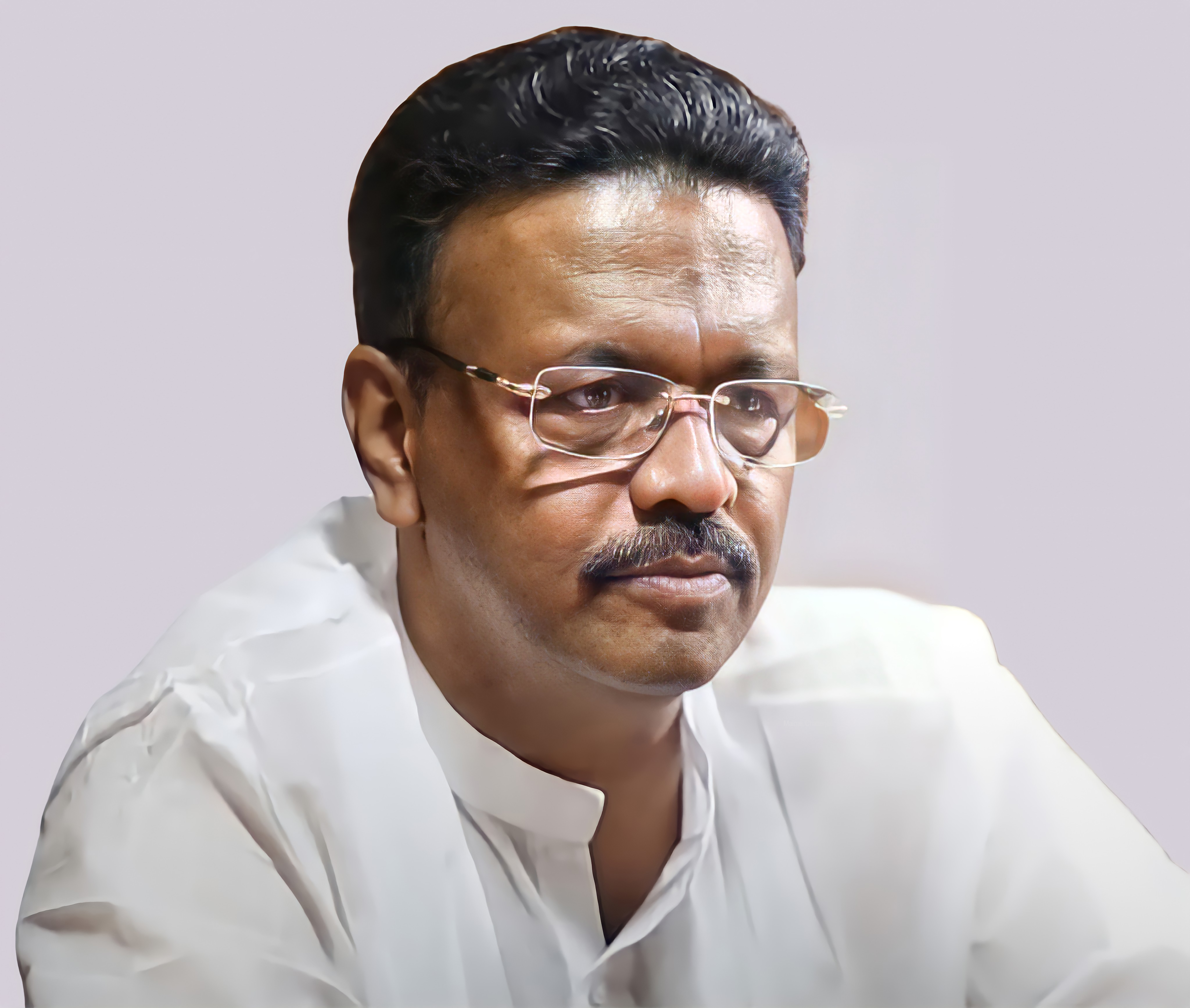
- Incumbent Firhad Hakim
- Party: DTC
- Elected year: 2026

Kolkata Port Assembly constituency (earlier known as Garden Reach Assembly constituency) is a Legislative Assembly constituency of Kolkata district in the Indian state of West Bengal.

== Overview ==
As per the Delimitation Commission order in respect of the Delimitation of constituencies in West Bengal, Kolkata Port Assembly constituency is composed of the following:

- Ward Nos. 75, 76, 78, 79, 80, 133, 134, 135 of Kolkata Municipal Corporation.

Borough	Ward No.	Councillor	2021 Winner
IX	75	Nizamuddin Shams	Trinamool Congress
IX	76	Shashti Das	Trinamool Congress
IX	78	Soma Das	Trinamool Congress
IX	79	Ram Pyare Ram	Trinamool Congress
IX	80	Mohammad Anwar Khan	Trinamool Congress
XV	133	Ranajit Shil	Trinamool Congress
XV	134	Shams Iqbal	Trinamool Congress
XV	135	Rubina Naaz	Trinamool Congress

Kolkata Port Assembly constituency is part of No. 23 Kolkata Dakshin Lok Sabha constituency.

== Members of the Legislative Assembly ==
Year	Name	Party
1952	S.M. Abdullah	Indian National Congress
1957	Shaikh Abdullah Farooquie	Communist Party of India
1962	S.M. Abdullah	Indian National Congress
1967	S.M. Abdullah	Indian National Congress
1969	Arun Sen	Communist Party of India
1971	S.M. Abdullah	Indian National Congress
1972	Chhedilal Singh	Communist Party of India (Marxist)
1977	Chhedilal Singh	Communist Party of India (Marxist)
1982	Samsuzzoha	Indian National Congress
1987	Fazle Azim Molla	Indian National Congress
1991	Fazle Azim Molla	Indian National Congress
1996	Mohammed Amin	Communist Party of India (Marxist)
2001	Mohammed Amin	Communist Party of India (Marxist)
2006	Abdul Khaleque Molla	Indian National Congress
Constituency renamed from Garden Reach to Kolkata Port
2011	Firhad Hakim	Trinamool Congress
2016	Firhad Hakim	Trinamool Congress
2021	Firhad Hakim	Trinamool Congress
2026	Firhad Hakim	Trinamool Congress

== Election results ==
Vote share of Winning candidates
2026	65.43%
2021	69.23%
2016	53.21%
2011	48.64%
2006	48.42%
2001	60.72%
1996	52.80%
1991	52.88%
1987	52.53%
1982	48.87%
1977	48.06%
1972	50.43%
1971	34.15%
1969	57.51%
1967	39.89%
1962	58.15%
1957	51.56%
1952	49.96%

=== 2026 ===
2026 West Bengal Legislative Assembly election: Kolkata Port
Party	Candidate	Votes	%	±%
AITC	Firhad Hakim	101,226	65.43	
BJP	Rakesh Singh	45,146	29.18	
CPI(M)	Faiyaz Ahmad Khan	2,571	1.66	
INC	Aquib Gulzar	2,533	1.64	
IND	Sanjay Dey	786	0.51	
NOTA	None of the above	573	0.37	
Majority		56,080	36.25	
Turnout		154,702	90.03	
AITC hold		Swing		

=== 2021 ===
2021 West Bengal Legislative Assembly election: Kolkata Port
Party	Candidate	Votes	%	±%
AITC	Firhad Hakim	105,543	69.23	
BJP	Awadh Kishore Gupta	36,989	24.26	
INC	Md. Mukhtar	5,590	3.67	
NOTA	None of the above	1,360	0.89	
IND	Sanjay Dey	1,139	0.75	
BSP	Khan Sarfaraz	748	0.49	
IND	Kalpana Chohan	428	0.28	
SUCI(C)	Sk. Jayed Hossain	180	0.12	
JD(U)	Manjay Kumar Roy	175	0.11	
IND	Jay Prakash Shaw	165	0.11	
IND	Biswajit Halder	126	0.08	
Majority		68,554	44.97	
Turnout		152,443	64.61	
AITC hold		Swing		

=== 2016 ===
2016 West Bengal Legislative Assembly election: Kolkata Port
Party	Candidate	Votes	%	±%
AITC	Firhad Hakim	73,459	53.21	
INC	Rakesh Singh	46,911	33.98	
BJP	Awadh Kishore Gupta	11,700	8.48	
NOTA	None of the above	2,164	1.57	
IND	Vivek Kumar Thakur	1,019	0.74	
BSP	Sarfaraz Khan	837	0.61	
IND	Subrata Saha	808	0.59	
IND	Raj Kumar Chhetry	290	0.21	
IND	Biswajit Halder	261	0.19	
IND	Sk. Rajuddin	257	0.19	
IND	Karan Singh	206	0.15	
IND	Deoraj Yadav	138	0.10	
Majority		26,548	19.23	
Turnout		138,050	63.42	
AITC hold		Swing		

=== 2011 ===
2011 West Bengal Legislative Assembly election: Kolkata Port
Party	Candidate	Votes	%	±%
AITC	Firhad Hakim	63,866	48.64	
AIFB	Moinuddin Shams	38,833	29.57	
IND	Ram Pyare Ram (Note: Ram Pyare Ram, contesting as an independent, was a rebel INC candidate and Ex-MLA of Kabitirtha.)	22,131	16.85	
BJP	Raj Kumari Shaw	2,699	2.06	
IND	Sanjay Lal Das	2,046	1.56	
IND	Krishnendu Banerjee	1,157	0.88	
IND	Amitava Banerjee	582	0.44	
Majority		25,033	19.07	
Turnout		131,314	65.91	
AITC gain from INC		Swing		

=== 2006 ===
2006 West Bengal Legislative Assembly election: Garden Reach
Party	Candidate	Votes	%	±%
INC	Abdul Khaleque Molla	45,557	48.42	
CPI(M)	Amin Mohammed	36,683	38.99	
AITC	Biman Banerjee	10,017	10.65	
IND	Md. Maqsood Ali	1,835	1.95	
Majority		8,874	9.43	
Turnout		94,092		
INC gain from CPI(M)		Swing		

=== 2001 ===
2001 West Bengal Legislative Assembly election: Garden Reach
Party	Candidate	Votes	%	±%
CPI(M)	Amin Mohammed	77,681	60.72	
AITC	Fazle Azim Molla	45,757	35.77	
BJP	Md. Qayoum Ansari	2,176	1.70	
IND	Ruhul Amin	903	0.71	
NCP	Md. Akbar	864	0.68	
IND	Md. Maqsood Ali	552	0.43	
Majority		31,924	24.95	
Turnout		128,411	71.93	
CPI(M) hold		Swing		

=== 1996 ===
1996 West Bengal Legislative Assembly election: Garden Reach
Party	Candidate	Votes	%	±%
CPI(M)	Mohammed Amin	66,006	52.80	
INC	Fazle Azim Molla	51,838	41.47	
BJP	Budh Karan Basotia	5,100	4.08	
IND	Moynul Haque Chowdhury	964	0.77	
AIIC(T)	S. M. Zafrullah	739	0.59	
IND	Sekendar Ali Mollah	227	0.18	
IND	Ramesh Dubey	136	0.11	
Majority		14,168	11.33	
Turnout		128,392	74.38	
CPI(M) gain from INC		Swing		

=== 1991 ===
1991 West Bengal Legislative Assembly election: Garden Reach
Party	Candidate	Votes	%	±%
INC	Fazle Azim Molla	50,989	52.88	
CPI(M)	Dilip Sen	39,695	41.17	
BJP	Upendra Nath Das	5,408	5.61	
IND	Abdur Rahaman	224	0.23	
DDP	Ramayan Sah	113	0.12	
Majority		11,294	11.71	
Turnout		98,934	70.61	
INC hold		Swing		

=== 1987 ===
1987 West Bengal Legislative Assembly election: Garden Reach
Party	Candidate	Votes	%	±%
INC	Fazle Azim Molla	45,213	52.53	
CPI(M)	Md. Amin	35,457	41.20	
IND	Raj Kamal Tewari	3,235	3.76	
IND	Syed Golam	1,424	1.65	
IND	Jamin	472	0.55	
IND	Ramayan Sah	205	0.24	
IND	S. M. Zafrullah	57	0.07	
Majority		9,756	11.33	
Turnout		87,936	66.38	
INC hold		Swing		

=== 1982 ===
1982 West Bengal Legislative Assembly election: Garden Reach
Party	Candidate	Votes	%	±%
INC	Shamsuzzoha	32,844	48.87	
CPI(M)	Chhedi Lal Singh	32,382	48.19	
JP	Syed Golam Md.	912	1.36	
IND	Bimal Dhar	627	0.93	
IND	Ram Sharan	436	0.65	
Majority		462	0.68	
Turnout		69,812	57.25	
INC gain from CPI(M)		Swing		

=== 1977 ===
1977 West Bengal Legislative Assembly election: Garden Reach
Party	Candidate	Votes	%	±%
CPI(M)	Chhedilal Singh	22,719	48.06	
INC	S. M. Abdullah	13,947	29.50	
CPI	Arun Sen	6,388	13.51	
JP	Shahshah Jehangir Ghaffar	2,647	5.60	
IUML	Zahurul Islam	905	1.91	
RPI	Ram Saran	593	1.25	
IND	Rash Behari Singh	74	0.16	
Majority		8,772	18.56	
Turnout		48,500	44.62	
CPI(M) hold		Swing		

=== 1972 ===
1972 West Bengal Legislative Assembly election: Garden Reach
Party	Candidate	Votes	%	±%
CPI(M)	Chhedilal Singh	25,625	50.43	
INC	S. M. Abdullah	24,245	47.71	
RPI	Ram Saran	945	1.86	
Majority		1,380	2.72	
Turnout		51,639	57.34	
CPI(M) gain from INC		Swing		

=== 1971 ===
1971 West Bengal Legislative Assembly election: Garden Reach
Party	Candidate	Votes	%	±%
INC	S. M. Abduliam	15,582	34.15	
CPI(M)	Chhedi Lal	15,493	33.96	
CPI	Arun Sen	12,649	27.72	
IND	Md. Abdul Bagt	1,393	3.05	
RPI	Ram Saran	510	1.12	
Majority		89	0.19	
Turnout		47,113	52.98	
INC gain from CPI		Swing		

=== 1969 ===
1969 West Bengal Legislative Assembly election: Garden Reach
Party	Candidate	Votes	%	±%
CPI	Arun Sen	29,871	57.51	
LKD	S. M. Abdullah	9,954	19.16	
INC	Abdur Rashid	9,203	17.72	
PML	Islam Uddin Laskar	2,377	4.58	
RPI	Ramsharan	344	0.66	
NDF	M. A. Wahid	116	0.22	
IND	Subodh Kumar Paul	74	0.14	
Majority		19,917	38.35	
Turnout		52,693	63.28	
CPI gain from INC		Swing		

=== 1967 ===
1967 West Bengal Legislative Assembly election: Garden Reach
Party	Candidate	Votes	%	±%
INC	S. M. Abdullah	18,443	39.89	
IND	H. N. H. Mali	13,154	28.45	
IND	M. R. Khan	7,150	15.46	
IND	N. D. Gupta	6,194	13.40	
IND	M. S. Sahid	1,293	2.80	
Majority		5,289	11.44	
Turnout		48,193	61.58	
INC hold		Swing		

=== 1962 ===
1962 West Bengal Legislative Assembly election: Garden Reach
Party	Candidate	Votes	%	±%
INC	S. M. Abdullah	29,486	58.15	
CPI	Shaikh Abdullah Farouquie	21,220	41.85	
Majority		8,266	16.30	
Turnout		51,551	71.31	
INC gain from CPI		Swing		

=== 1957 ===
1957 West Bengal Legislative Assembly election: Garden Reach
Party	Candidate	Votes	%	±%
CPI	Shaikh Abduallah Farouquie	16,619	51.56	
INC	S. M. Abdullah	12,685	39.35	
IND	Shafiur Rahman	1,998	6.20	
HM	Kirshna Nath Chatterji	597	1.85	
IND	Islamuddin Laskar	334	1.04	
Majority		3,934	12.21	
Turnout		32,233	48.80	
CPI gain from INC		Swing		

=== 1952 ===
1952 West Bengal Legislative Assembly election: Garden Reach
Party	Candidate	Votes	%	±%
INC	S. M. Abdullah	11,471	49.96	
CPI	Shaikh Abdulla Farooqui	7,186	31.30	
ABJS	Hrishikesh Paul	1,973	8.59	
IND	Mahabbat Khan	1,202	5.23	
Socialist	Narayan Das Gupta	488	2.13	
FB(MG)	K. K. Ram	276	1.20	
KMPP	Raj Kishore Singh	157	0.68	
IND	Sayed Mahammad Ali	129	0.56	
IND	Acharji Lall Chopra	79	0.34	
Majority		4,285	18.66	
Turnout		22,961	44.23	
INC win (new seat)				
