= Mohammed Amin (politician) =

Indian politician (1928–2018)

General Secretary of the Centre of Indian Trade Unions
- In office 27 May 2007 – 21 March 2010
- Preceded by: Chittabrata Majumdar
- Succeeded by: Tapan Kumar Sen

Minister of Transport in Government of West Bengal
- In office February 1970 – March 1970
- In office 1977–1982

Minister of Minority Affairs in Government of West Bengal
- In office 1996–2001

Minister of Labour in Government of West Bengal
- In office 1991–1996

MLA for Titagarh
- In office 1969–1982
- Preceded by: Krishnakumar Shukla
- Succeeded by: Gangaprasad Show

MLA for Garden Reach
- In office 1996–2006
- Preceded by: Fazl-e Azim Mollah
- Succeeded by: Abdul Khaleque Molla

Member of Parliament (Rajya Sabha) from West Bengal
- In office 1988-1994, 2007 – August 2011

Personal details
- Born: 15 April 1928 Shibpur, Bengal, British Indian Empire
- Died: 12 February 2018 (aged 89) Kolkata, West Bengal, India
- Party: Communist Party of India (Marxist) from 1964

Mohammed Amin (15 April 1928 – 12 February 2018) was an Indian politician from the Communist Party of India (Marxist), the largest communist party in India. He was a Vice President of the Centre of Indian Trade Unions.

He was a member of the Parliament of India representing West Bengal in the Rajya Sabha, the upper house of the Indian Parliament from 1988 to 1994. He was also the All India General Secretary of the Centre of Indian Trade Unions, the workers union politically affiliated with the Communist Party of India (Marxist).

== Early life ==
He was born to an Urdu-speaking family at Shibpur in April 1928. His grandfather Abdur Rehman hailed from Varanasi District and was a farmer, who had left for Karachi and had then settled at Shibpur. Amin's father was brought up by a vindictive step-mother. Amin's mother hailed from Bhagalpur District. When Amin was 8 years, he was one of two boys in his neighbourhood who survived an epidemic of smallpox. He had no formal education. He became a jute mill worker in 1942 at a time when Calcutta was experiencing regular bombardments during World War II. His wage was then Rs. 7 and 13 annah per 1100 yards of jute. He worked entire day, and had some English education at a night school. He became a member of the Bengal Jute Mill Mazdoor Union at that time. After the end of World War II in 1945, he left his job and entered politics.

== Career ==
=== Introduction to politics ===
In 1946 when he was only 18, he had earned the membership of Communist Party of India on the same day along with Chandra Roy. On 29 July 1946, he attended a huge rally at Maidan on the call of Bengal Provincial Trade Union Congress (BPTUC), a state wing of All India Trade Union Congress (AITUC), on a day when a successful strike was organised on BPTUC's call. He had also experienced the riots of Calcutta in 1946-47 till independence. He had married in March 1948. His father-in-law died of cholera after 6 months, and after another 6 months his mother died of tetanus.

=== Riots of 1950, migration to East Pakistan, imprisonment & return to India ===
On 29 March, Alambazar of Kolkata experienced another bloody riot following massive influx of refugees from East Pakistan after 1950 Barisal Riots. Within hours of an attack on a Bengali Hindu by a Muslim whose family was slaughtered by Hindus on previous night, riots spread and around 5000 Muslims had taken refuge on the roof of Baranagar jute mill. Ten Muslims were murdered including a woman. At that point, the Communist Party of India (CPI) leadership had instructed the party members to move to East Pakistan. On 7 April, Amin along with his family boarded a special train from Dakshineswar towards Gede via Ranaghat and then reached Darshana by walking 12 km across the border. From there, they took a train to reach Parbatipur in Dinajpur district. They had stayed as refugee in Dinajpur till October 1950, and had even organised a mass rally there and was subsequently warned by police. He came back to India, but was again re-instructed by his party in March 1951 to organise the party at Saidpur in East Pakistan. In September, he was arrested in Badarganj for being a Communist under Section 7/3, Public Safety Act.

On 12 November 1953 he was released from Rangpur jail after 20 months of detention. He returned to Titagarh immediately. He was made a member of Titagarh Local Committee of the CPI. He started movement with the Beedi Mazdoor Union at Titagarh and then as the organiser at a jute mill at Khardaha. While organising trade union in Britannia Engineering Ltd. in Titagarh, he was assisted by Suren Dhar Chowdhury, Sunil Roy, Dr. Girijamohon Chatterjee (an influential MBBS doctor). In 1957 assembly elections, Amin was entrusted by his party to Bhatpara and ensured that CPI's candidate Sitaram Gupta defeated Indian National Congress candidate by 240 votes. In 1962 assembly elections, Suren Dhar Chowdhury was the CPI's candidate & he lost the elections by around 2000 votes to Krishnakant Shukla who became MLA for 3rd time. In 1964, when the communist party split, Amin joined the newly formed Communist Party of India (Marxist) CPI(M) with most of the workers though Suren Dhar Chowdhury and Sunil Roy stayed loyal to the CPI.

=== Introduction to legislative politics ===
In 1967 assembly elections, Amin was made the CPI(M) candidate at Titagarh and though Promode Dasgupta campaigned for him, yet Amin lost the election due to cross-voting between the Communists. Suren Dhar Chowdhury, the CPI's candidate got 11000 votes, Amin got 17400 & Indian National Congress candidate Krishnakant Shukla won by 700 votes. On the request of Dasgupta, Amin left his job of Rs. 1000 salary & became a party whole-timer. In 1969, Amin won the assembly elections from Titagarh and in February 1970, he was made the Minister of Transport to the United Front government led by Ajoy Mukherjee. After 13 months of the 1969 assembly elections, the government was disbanded and in the 1971 assembly elections, Amin won beating horrific semi-fascist terror as administration had turned deaf & dumb. His residence was bombarded.

In 1971, in the West Bengal State Conference of CPI(M) at Midnapore, he was elected as a member of the West Bengal State Committee. 1972 assembly elections in West Bengal can be described as a farce and a mockery of democracy as terror of unforeseen proportions were unleashed. Amin lost elections by 40,000 votes and Jyoti Basu lost by 50,000 votes. Amin kept his family at Ranchi and returned to Calcutta. Kishan Mazdoor, the Urdu weekly of CPI(M) resumed its publication under his patronage. He brought back his family to Calcutta. In 1969 8th party congress at Cochin, he was a delegate.

In 1977 assembly elections, CPI(M) won with a sweeping majority and formed the Left Front government led by Jyoti Basu. Amin was re-elected from Titagarh defeating municipal Chairman Gangaprasad Show by a margin of 13000. Amin the Minister of Transport in this 1st Left Front government. As a minister, he had sold an eight-seated helicopter owned by the West Bengal Govt, and with that money bought double-decker buses to improve public transport in Calcutta. He gave permit to several new routes for SBSTC, private bus, minibus & long-route buses. He had also successfully implemented the launch & steamer service in the Hooghly Riverways whose initiative was taken in his early stint during the United Front government. As an MLA, he made sure that the state government acquisitioned the Britannia Engg. Ltd. at Titagarh and re-instate all its workers with less than 58 years age. The Kennison Jute Mill at Titagarh was also acquisitioned by the Govt. of India after it was shut down by the Bard & Co.

In 1982 assembly elections, Amin was however defeated at Titagarh by 132 votes. In the same year, he was co-opted into the Central Committee of the party. In 12th party congress at Calcutta in 1985, he was elected as a member of the Central Committee along with Anil Biswas, Biman Bose and Buddhadeb Bhattacharjee. In 1984 parliament elections, he was launched as a candidate from Barrackpore (Lok Sabha constituency). However, he lost as Indian National Congress gained sympathy votes following the assassination of Prime Minister Indira Gandhi. He lost assembly elections from Titagarh again in 1987 as Prime Minister Rajiv Gandhi declared that if Congress wins at Titagarh, he would ensure that all the closed mills & factories would be re-opened. In 1988, he was nominated as a candidate by his party into the Rajya Sabha and remained as an MP till 1994, and re-located to New Delhi.

In 1996, Amin was made a CPI(M) candidate from Garden Reach, a constituency which has deluded the Left Front candidate thrice in a row. Amin won the seat by a whopping 14,000 votes and was made a Minister of Minorities Affairs & Development. After Rekha Bera, the Minister of Employment & E.S.I died, Amin was given additional charge of that ministry. In 1998, Amin was made a Secretariat member of CPI(M) West Bengal State Committee.

In 2001 assembly elections, Amin was re-elected from Garden Reach by a margin of 32,000 votes. He was made a Minister of Labour to the 6th Left Front government led by Buddhadeb Bhattacharjee as his predecessor Shanti Ghatak became ill before the elections, and died soon after. In 2005, his wife Moimunnisa died. In 2006 assembly elections, though Left Front increased the seats & votes, yet Amin lost surprisingly from Garden Reach. In 2007, he was elected General Secretary of the Centre of Indian Trade Unions from the 12th Conference at Bangalore held from 17 to 21 January. M. K. Pandhe was re-elected as the President. In March 2010, at the 13th Conference of Centre of Indian Trade Unions, Amin was succeeded by Tapan Sen as the General Secretary as Amin was becoming increasingly ill. Amin was made the Vice President. At the 2012, in the 20th party congress at Kozhikode (4 April-9 April), he was made a Special Invitee to the Central Committee.

== Death ==
He died on February 12, 2018, at the age of 89 at his home in Kolkata.
