= Garden Reach Assembly constituency =

Former West Bengal Legislative Assembly constituency

Garden Reach
- Former constituency No. 114 for the West Bengal Legislative Assembly

Constituency details
- Country: India
- Region: East India
- State: West Bengal
- District: South 24 Parganas
- Lok Sabha constituency: Diamond Harbour
- Established: 1951
- Abolished: 2011
- Reservation: None

Garden Reach Assembly constituency was a Legislative Assembly constituency of South 24 Parganas district in the Indian state of West Bengal. It ceased to exist as a constituency from 2011.

== Overview ==
As a consequence of the orders of the Delimitation Commission, while Kolkata Port Assembly constituency came into existence in 2011, Garden Reach Assembly constituency ceased to exist from the same year.

It was part of Diamond Harbour (Lok Sabha constituency).

== Members of the Legislative Assembly ==
| Year | Name | Party |
|---|---|---|
| 1951 | S. M. Abdullah | Indian National Congress |
| 1957 | Shaikh Abdullah Farooquie | Communist Party of India |
| 1962 | S. M. Abdullah | Indian National Congress |
| 1967 | S. M. Abdullah | Indian National Congress |
| 1969 | Arun Sen | Communist Party of India |
| 1971 | S. M. Abdullah | Indian National Congress |
| 1972 | Chhedilal Singh | Communist Party of India (Marxist) |
| 1977 | Chhedilal Singh | Communist Party of India (Marxist) |
| 1982 | Samsuzzoha | Indian National Congress |
| 1987 | Fazle Azim Molla | Indian National Congress |
| 1991 | Fazle Azim Molla | Indian National Congress |
| 1996 | Mohammed Amin | Communist Party of India (Marxist) |
| 2001 | Mohammed Amin | Communist Party of India (Marxist) |
| 2006 | Abdul Khaleque Molla | Indian National Congress |

== Election results ==
=== 1977-2006 ===
In the 2006 state assembly elections Abdul Khaleque Molla of Congress won the 114 Garden Reach assembly seat defeating his nearest rival Mohammed Amin of CPI(M). Mohammed Amin of CPI(M) defeated Fazle Azim Molla of Trinamool Congress in 2001 and of Congress in 1996. Fazle Azim Molla of Congress defeated Dilip Sen of CPI(M) in 1991 and Mohammed Amin of CPI(M) in 1987. Shamsuzzoha of Congress defeated Chhedilal Singh of CPI(M) in 1982. Chhedilal Singh of CPI(M) defeated S.M. Abdullah of Congress in 1977.

=== 1951-1972 ===
Chhedilal Singh of CPI(M) won in 1972. S.M. Abdullah of Congress won in 1971. Arun Sen of CPI won in 1969. S.M.Abdullah of Congress won in 1967 and 1962. Shaikh Abduallah Farooquie of CPI won in 1957. S.M. Abdullah of Congress won in independent India’s first election in 1951.
