= Kolkata Municipal Corporation =

Local civic body in Kolkata, West Bengal, India

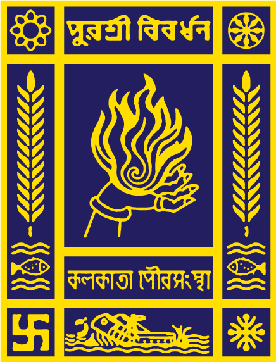
- Emblem of the Kolkata Municipal Corporation

Type
- Type: Municipal Corporation
- Term limits: 5 years

History
- Founded: 1876; 150 years ago

Leadership
- Mayor: Vacant since 5 June 2026
- Deputy Mayor: Vacant since 8 June 2026
- Chairperson: Vacant since 8 June 2026
- Municipal Commissioner: Smita Pandey, IAS

Structure
- Seats: 209
- Political groups: Dissolved

Elections
- Voting system: First-past-the-post
- Last election: 19 December 2021
- Next election: November 2026

Motto
- পুরশ্রী বিবর্ধন; Perennial progress of the City's prosperity

Meeting place
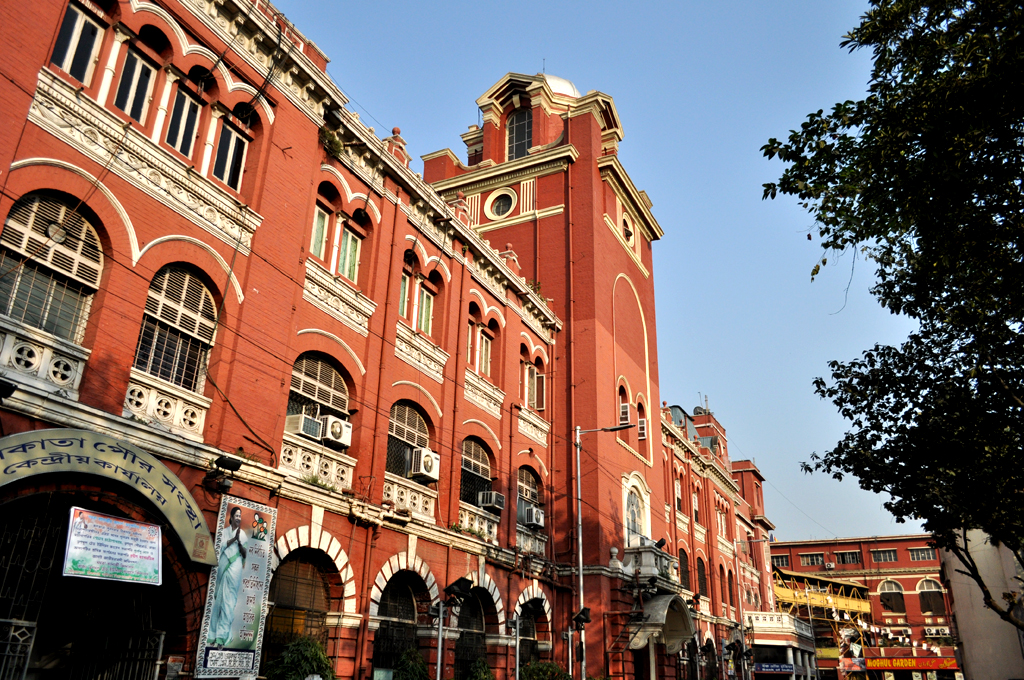
- Headquarters of the Kolkata Municipal Corporation

Website
- www.kmcgov.in

Kolkata Municipal Corporation (KMC) is the local government of the Indian city of Kolkata, the state capital of West Bengal. This civic administrative body administers an area of 206.08 square kilometres (79.57 sq mi). Its motto, Puroshri Bibardhan, is inscribed on its emblem in Bengali script. It is headed by a mayor, who presides over 209 councillors, each of whom represents one of the 209 wards of the city.

== History ==
According to the official website of the Kolkata Municipal Corporation, the origins of Kolkata can be traced to the Mughal period, when the area was mentioned in the Ain-i-Akbari as part of an imperial estate. The villages of Sutanuti, Kalikata and Gobindapur, located along the eastern bank of the Hooghly River, later formed the nucleus of the modern city. In 1698, the East India Company acquired the zamindari rights of these villages from the Sabarna Roy Choudhury family, paving the way for the establishment of British control and the construction of Fort William.

Kolkata soon emerged as an important administrative and commercial centre under British rule. The first municipal corporation was established in 1726 through a royal charter consisting of a Mayor and Aldermen, marking the beginning of organized civic administration in the city. During the eighteenth and nineteenth centuries, Kolkata experienced rapid urban growth, leading to the development of roads, drainage systems, water supply infrastructure, public markets and conservancy services. Institutions such as the Town Improvement Committee and Lottery Committee contributed significantly to civic planning and urban development.

Municipal governance evolved through a series of legislative reforms. The Calcutta Municipal Consolidation Act of 1876 introduced a more representative corporation with elected commissioners, while the Mackenzie Act of 1899 reorganized the municipal structure. A major democratic reform came with the Calcutta Municipal Act of 1923 under the leadership of Sir Surendranath Banerjee, which introduced the annual election of the Mayor and expanded civic participation, including enfranchisement of women. Deshbandhu Chittaranjan Das became the first elected Mayor of Kolkata, and Subhas Chandra Bose later served as the Corporation’s Chief Executive Officer.

Under the guidance of the first Minister of Local Self-Government in Bengal, Sir Surendranath Banerjee, the Calcutta Municipal Act of 1923 made provision for the enfranchisement of women and the election of a Mayor of Kolkata annually. Deshbandhu Chittaranjan Das was the first Mayor of Kolkata Municipal Corporation with Subhas Chandra Bose as his Chief Executive Officer. Deshbandhu famously gave the position of the Chief Executive Officer to Bose over a more experienced Deshapran Birendranath Sasmal. Later mayors include Deshapriya Jatindra Mohan Sengupta, Subhas Chandra Bose, Bidhan Chandra Roy, Nalini Ranjan Sarkar, Abul Kasem Fazlul Haque, Triguna Sen, Bikash Ranjan Bhattacharya.

Ward wise KMC population density

Gradual expansion of Kolkata Municipal Corporation

After independence, the Calcutta Municipal Act of 1951 restructured the civic administration with elected councillors, standing committees and a municipal commissioner. In 1984, the Calcutta Municipal Corporation Act of 1980 introduced the Mayor-in-Council system, creating a stronger and more autonomous framework of urban governance. Over time, neighbouring municipalities such as Jadavpur, South Suburban, Garden Reach and Joka were incorporated into the Corporation, helping shape the present-day administrative structure of Kolkata Municipal Corporation.

== Emblem ==
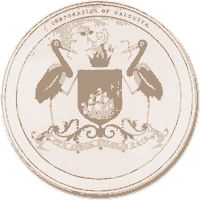
Old Emblem of Calcutta Municipal Corporation

According to the official website of the Kolkata Municipal Corporation, the first emblem of the Corporation was introduced in 1896. It featured two adjutant birds holding serpents in their beaks while supporting a crown on their shoulders.

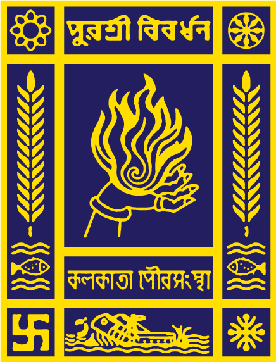
Current Emblem of Kolkata Municipal Corporation

On 22 February 1961, the Corporation adopted a new emblem reflecting the ideals and identity of the modern civic body. The emblem bears the inscription “Purosree Bibardhan” in old Bengali script at the top and “Kolkata Paurosangstha” below it in Bengali script.

The lower portion of the emblem contains the figure of a traditional Mayurpankshi boat sailing over wavy lines, symbolizing the historic riverine and maritime trade traditions of Bengal and Kolkata. The emblem also contains four symbolic panels: a lotus representing beauty and culture, a wheel symbolizing industry and progress, a swastika denoting prosperity, and a double thunderbolt representing strength, high ideals and electrical power.

The side panels depict stalks of rice and fish motifs, symbolizing food supply and auspiciousness respectively. At the centre of the emblem is the “Hand of Fire,” representing purity, civic ideals and the removal of disease, filth and negligence.

== Structure ==
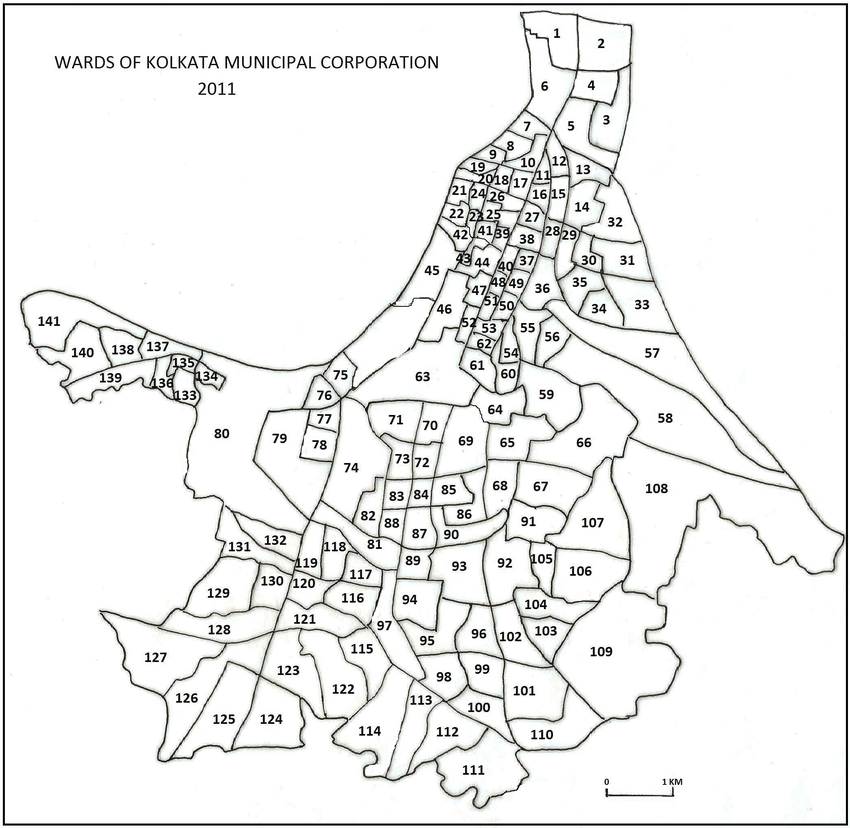
Kolkata Municipal Corporation ward level map as of 2011 Census. Three additional wards have been added since then, taking the total to 144.

The city is divided into 209 administrative wards that are grouped into 16 boroughs. Each of these wards elects a councillor to the KMC. Each borough has a committee consisting of the councillors elected from the respective wards of the boroughs. The Corporation, through the borough committees, maintains government-aided schools, hospitals and municipal markets and partakes in urban planning and road maintenance. The corporation as the apex body discharges its function through the Mayor-in-Council, consisting of a mayor, assisted by a deputy mayor, and ten other elected members of the KMC. The mayor is responsible for the overall functioning of the KMC and has a tenure of five years. At present, the All India Trinamool Congress holds the power in the KMC.

Borough	Wards
I	1, 2, 3, 4, 5, 6, 7, 8, 9
II	10, 11, 12, 15, 16, 17, 18, 19, 20
III	13, 14, 29, 30, 31, 32, 33, 34, 35
IV	21, 22, 23, 24, 25, 26, 27, 28, 38, 39
V	36, 37, 40, 41, 42, 43, 44, 45, 48, 49, 50
VI	46, 47, 51, 52, 53, 54, 55, 60, 61, 62
VII	56, 57, 58, 59, 63, 64, 65, 66, 67
VIII	68, 69, 70, 72, 83, 84, 85, 86, 87, 88, 90
IX	71, 73, 74, 75, 76, 77, 78, 79, 80, 82
X	81, 89, 91, 92, 93, 94, 95, 96, 97, 98, 99, 100
XI	103, 104, 110, 111, 112, 113, 114
XII	101, 102, 105, 106, 107, 108, 109
XIII	115, 116, 117, 118, 119, 120, 122
XIV	121, 127, 128, 129, 130, 131, 132
XV	133, 134, 135, 136, 137, 138, 139, 140, 141
XVI	123, 124, 125, 126, 142, 143, 144

== Current members ==
Kolkata Municipal Corporation has a total of 209 members or corporators, who are directly elected after a term of 5 years. The council is led by the Mayor. The latest elections were held in 19 December 2021. Firhad Hakim resigned from the post of Kolkata Mayor on 3 June 2026. In 2026, as per the new delimitation order passed by the Government of West Bengal, KMC's wards increased from 144 to 209.

Mayor: Vacant (Note: Firhad Hakim resigned from the post of Mayor of Kolkata on 3 June 2026)
Deputy Mayor: Vacant
Assembly	Ward Details	Councillor	Party	Remarks
Kashipur-Belgachhia	Ward No. 1			
Kashipur-Belgachhia	Ward No. 2			
Kashipur-Belgachhia	Ward No. 3			
Kashipur-Belgachhia	Ward No. 4			
Kashipur-Belgachhia	Ward No. 5			
Kashipur-Belgachhia	Ward No. 6			
Shyampukur	Ward No. 7			
Shyampukur	Ward No. 8			
Shyampukur	Ward No. 9			
Shyampukur	Ward No. 10			
Maniktala	Ward No. 11			
Maniktala	Ward No. 12			
Maniktala	Ward No. 13			
Maniktala	Ward No. 14			
Maniktala	Ward No. 15			
Maniktala	Ward No. 16			
Shyampukur	Ward No. 17			
Shyampukur	Ward No. 18			
Shyampukur	Ward No. 19			
Shyampukur	Ward No. 20			
Shyampukur	Ward No. 21			
Jorasanko	Ward No. 22			
Jorasanko	Ward No. 23			
Shyampukur	Ward No. 24			
Jorasanko	Ward No. 25			
Shyampukur	Ward No. 26			
Jorasanko	Ward No. 27			
Beleghata	Ward No. 28			
Beleghata	Ward No. 29			
Beleghata	Ward No. 30			
Maniktala	Ward No. 31			
Maniktala	Ward No. 32			
Beleghata	Ward No. 33			
Beleghata	Ward No. 34			
Beleghata	Ward No. 35			
Beleghata	Ward No. 36			
Jorasanko	Ward No. 37			
Jorasanko	Ward No. 38			
Jorasanko	Ward No. 39			
Jorasanko	Ward No. 40			
Jorasanko	Ward No. 41			
Jorasanko	Ward No. 42			
Jorasanko	Ward No. 43			
Chowranghee	Ward No. 44			
Chowranghee	Ward No. 45			
Chowranghee	Ward No. 46			
Chowranghee	Ward No. 47			
Chowranghee	Ward No. 48			
Chowranghee	Ward No. 49			
Chowranghee	Ward No. 50			
Chowranghee	Ward No. 51			
Chowranghee	Ward No. 52			
Chowranghee	Ward No. 53			
Entally	Ward No. 54			
Entally	Ward No. 55			
Entally	Ward No. 56			
Beleghata	Ward No. 57			
Entally	Ward No. 58			
Entally	Ward No. 59			
Ballygunge	Ward No. 60			
Ballygunge	Ward No. 61			
Chowranghee	Ward No. 62			
Bhabanipur	Ward No. 63			
Ballygunge	Ward No. 64			
Ballygunge	Ward No. 65			
Kasba	Ward No. 66			
Kasba	Ward No. 67			
Ballygunge	Ward No. 68			
Ballygunge	Ward No. 69			
Bhabanipur	Ward No. 70			
Bhabanipur	Ward No. 71			
Bhabanipur	Ward No. 72			
Bhabanipur	Ward No. 73			
Bhabanipur	Ward No. 74			
Kolkata Port	Ward No. 75			
Kolkata Port	Ward No. 76			
Bhabanipur	Ward No. 77			
Kolkata Port	Ward No. 78			
Kolkata Port	Ward No. 79			
Kolkata Port	Ward No. 80			
Rashbehari	Ward No. 81			
Bhabanipur	Ward No. 82			
Rashbehari	Ward No. 83			
Rashbehari	Ward No. 84			
Ballygunge	Ward No. 85			
Rashbehari	Ward No. 86			
Rashbehari	Ward No. 87			
Rashbehari	Ward No. 88			
Rashbehari	Ward No. 89			
Rashbehari	Ward No. 90			
Kasba	Ward No. 91			
Kasba	Ward No. 92			
Rashbehari	Ward No. 93			
Tollygunge	Ward No. 94			
Tollygunge	Ward No. 95			
Jadavpur	Ward No. 96			
Tollygunge	Ward No. 97			
Tollygunge	Ward No. 98			
Jadavpur	Ward No. 99			
Tollygunge	Ward No. 100			
Jadavpur	Ward No. 101			
Jadavpur	Ward No. 102			
Jadavpur	Ward No. 103			
Jadavpur	Ward No. 104			
Jadavpur	Ward No. 105			
Jadavpur	Ward No. 106			
Kasba	Ward No. 107			
Kasba	Ward No. 108			
Jadavpur	Ward No. 109			
Jadavpur	Ward No. 110			
Tollygunge	Ward No. 111			
Tollygunge	Ward No. 112			
Tollygunge	Ward No. 113			
Tollygunge	Ward No. 114			
Behala Purba	Ward No. 115			
Behala Purba	Ward No. 116			
Behala Purba	Ward No. 117			
Behala Paschim	Ward No. 118			
Behala Paschim	Ward No. 119			
Behala Purba	Ward No. 120			
Behala Purba	Ward No. 121			
Behala Purba	Ward No. 122			
Behala Purba	Ward No. 123			
Behala Purba	Ward No. 124			
Behala Paschim	Ward No. 125			
Behala Paschim	Ward No. 126			
Behala Paschim	Ward No. 127			
Behala Paschim	Ward No. 128			
Behala Paschim	Ward No. 129			
Behala Paschim	Ward No. 130			
Behala Paschim	Ward No. 131			
Behala Paschim	Ward No. 132			
Kolkata Port	Ward No. 133			
Kolkata Port	Ward No. 134			
Kolkata Port	Ward No. 135			
Metiaburuz	Ward No. 136			
Metiaburuz	Ward No. 137			
Metiaburuz	Ward No. 138			
Metiaburuz	Ward No. 139			
Metiaburuz	Ward No. 140			
Metiaburuz	Ward No. 141			
Behala Purba	Ward No. 142			
Behala Purba	Ward No. 143			
Behala Purba	Ward No. 144			

== Budget ==
As of 2024-25, the city government's budget is ₹5,166.79 crore (US$540 million), out of which ₹320 crore (US$33 million) was earmarked for roads and transport infrastructure, ₹692.14 crore (US$72 million) is to be spent on solid waste management, ₹408 crore (US$42 million) on water supply and ₹163 crore (US$17 million) on health services.

== Criticism ==
Recently the KMC has faced a lot of criticism for legalising unauthorized construction largely responsible for a number of deaths because of fire. This was also responsible of the unplanned growth in the city.

== The Sheriff of Kolkata and The KMDA ==
The city also has an apolitical titular post, that of the Sheriff of Kolkata. The Sheriff presides over various city-related functions and conferences. Another ancillary civic body is the Kolkata Metropolitan Development Authority (KMDA) responsible for the statutory planning and development of the Kolkata Metropolitan Area (KMA). The KMA includes a large suburban hinterland around the urban centre of Kolkata.

== Area of jurisdiction ==
The jurisdiction of the KMC covers the area covered by the Kolkata Police (which in turn includes the area of Kolkata District / KMC)

Kolkata Police Stations Map

In 2011, it was announced that Kolkata Police and Kolkata Municipal Corporation area will be coterminous.

Kolkata Postal District however extends right up to Barrackpur in the North, Barasat in the North-East, Rajarhat in the East, up to Baruipur in South-East and Pailan in South and up to Pujali in South-West. The Postal code in this entire area starts with 700, indicating Postal Sorting Division of Kolkata. Thus Kolkata Postal Division is much bigger than the area of KMC (Kolkata District) and Kolkata Police.

== Services ==
The KMC is responsible for administering and providing basic infrastructure to the city.

- Water purification and supply
- Sewage treatment and disposal
- Garbage disposal and street cleanliness
- Food Inspection:Through KMC Food Inspectors
- Solid waste management
- Building and maintenance of roads, streets and flyovers.
- Street lighting
- Maintenance of parks and open spaces
- Cemeteries and Crematoriums
- Registering of births and deaths
- Conservation of heritage sites
- Disease control, including immunisation
- Public municipal schools etc.

Control Room of Kolkata Municipal Corporation can be contacted at (033) 2286-1212.

== Department ==
Sl.No.	Department
1	Advertisement
2	Amusement
3	Assessment & Collection
4	Building
5	Bustee Services
6	Car Parking
7	Central Records
8	Ch. VS Department
9	Education
10	Election Office
11	Electricity
12	Engineering (Civil)
13	Entally workshop
14	Estate
15	Finance and accounts
16	Health
17	Info. & public relations
18	Information Technology
19	Institute of Urban Management
20	Internal Audit
21	Law
22	License
23	Lighting
24	Market
25	Municipal Secretary’s department
26	Municipal Service Commission
27	Parks & Squares
28	Personnel
29	Planning & Development
30	Printing
31	Environment & Heritage Department
32	Roads and Asphaltum
33	Sewerage & Drainage
34	Social Welfare & Urban Poverty Alleviation Department
35	Solid Waste Management
36	Supply
37	City Planning Dept
38	Treasury Department
39	Vigilance
40	Water Supply

== Elections ==
=== 2021 ===
S. No.	Party name	Party symbol	Councillors	Change	Map
1.	AITC		134	▲20	
2.	BJP		3	▼4	
3.	INC		2	▼3	
4.	CPI(M)		1	▼9	
5.	CPI		1	▼1	
6.	IND		3	Steady	

=== 2015 ===
S. No.	Party name	Party symbol	Councillors	Change	Map
1.	AITC		114	Steady	
2.	CPI(M)		10	Steady	
3.	BJP		7	Steady	
4.	INC		5	Steady	
5.	CPI		2	Steady	
6.	RSP		2	Steady	
7.	AIFB		1	Steady	
8.	IND		3	Steady	
