= Cossipore =

- Neighbourhood in Kolkata (Calcutta)
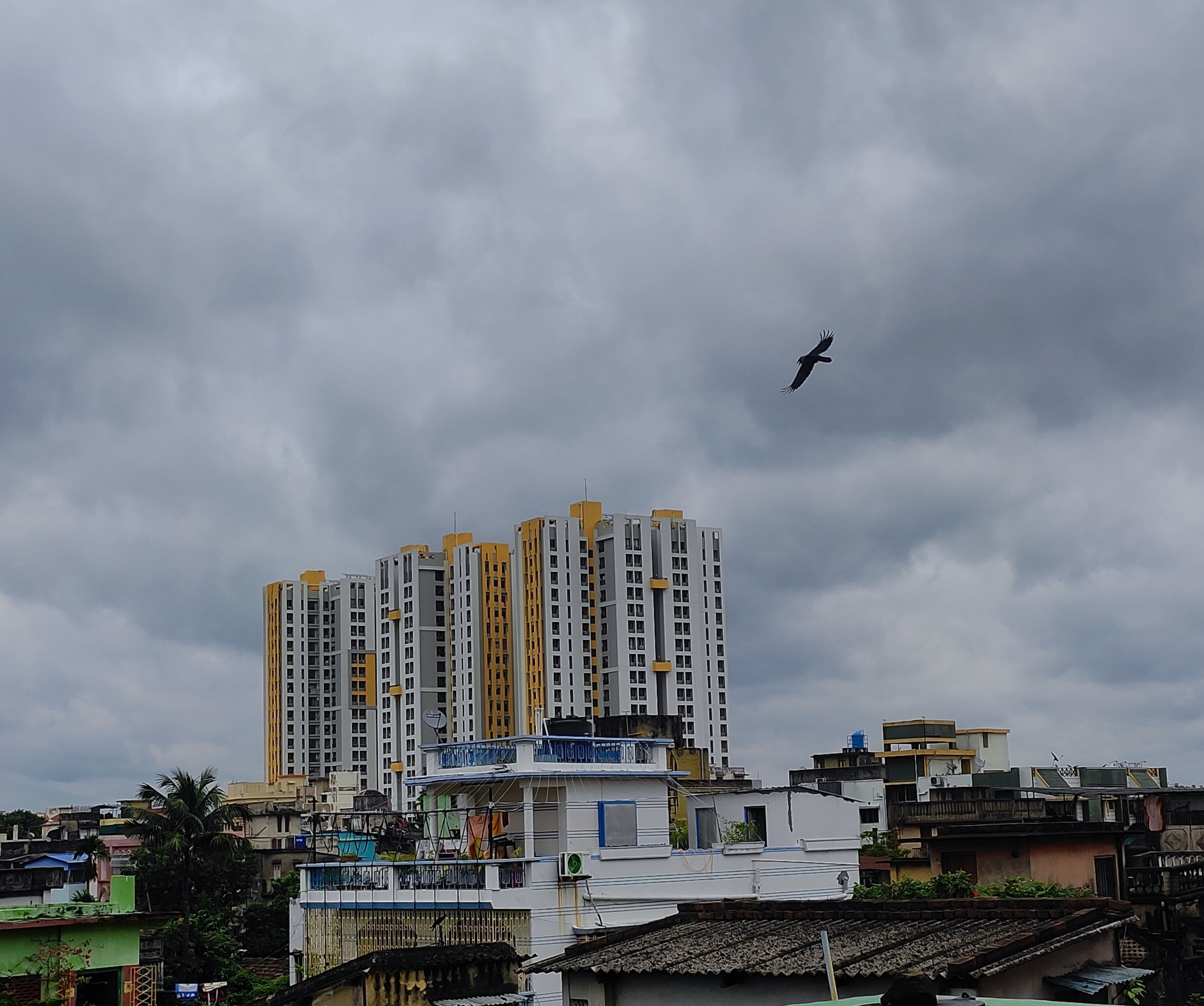
- A view from Satchasi Para, Cossipore

- Location in Kolkata
- Coordinates: 22.623°N 88.375°E
- Country: India
- State: West Bengal
- City: Kolkata
- District: Kolkata
- Metro Station: Dum Dum
- Municipal Corporation: Kolkata Municipal Corporation
- KMC wards: 1, 6
- Elevation: 36 ft (11 m)

Population
  - Total: For population see linked KMC ward page
- Time zone: UTC+5:30 (IST)
- PIN: 700002
- Area code: +91 33
- Lok Sabha constituency: Kolkata Uttar
- Vidhan Sabha constituency: Kashipur-Belgachhia

Cossipore (also spelt as Cossipur, Kashipur) is a neighbourhood of North Kolkata, in Kolkata district in the Indian state of West Bengal. One of the oldest neighbourhoods of the metropolis, it has a police station. Its name has been kept after Mulakchand Dewan Kashinathji, its one-time owner. He had been gifted Cossipore by Lord Clive.

== History ==
The East India Company obtained from the Mughal emperor Farrukhsiyar, in 1717, the right to rent from 38 villages surrounding their settlement. Of these 5 lay across the Hooghly in what is now Howrah district. The remaining 33 villages were on the Calcutta side. After the fall of Siraj-ud-daulah, the last independent Nawab of Bengal, it purchased these villages in 1758 from Mir Jafar and reorganised them. These villages were known en-bloc as Dihi Panchannagram, and Cossipore was one of them. It was considered to be a suburb beyond the limits of the Maratha Ditch. Due to his deteriorating health, Ramakrishna Paramhansa shifted to the Cossipore Garden House on 11 December 1885. Here he founded the Ramakrishna Order by initiating twelve of his close disciples, in January 1886 and later died on 16 August 1886.

H. E. A. Cotton writes, "The Cossipore Reach was one of the finest on the river, and is lined by several villa residences." From those days Cossipore had a number of industrial units. – the Government Gun Foundry, the Snider and Rifle Shell factories (originally constructed by Colonel Hutchinson), sugar mills and jute screw houses.

Entally, Manicktala, Beliaghata, Ultadanga, Chitpur, Cossipore, parts of Beniapukur, Ballygunge, Watgunge and Ekbalpur and parts of Garden Reach and Tollygunj were added to Kolkata Municipal Corporation in 1888. Garden Reach was later taken out.

== Geography ==
=== KMC ward ===
Ward No. 1 and Ward No. 6 of Kolkata Municipal Corporation cover Cossipore. It has six prominent ghats on the Hooghly – from south - Cossipore Ghat, Sadhur Ghat, Ranir Ghat, Pramanick Ghat, Ramakrishna Mahasashan and Ratan Babu Ghat.

=== Police district ===
Cossipore police station is part of the North and North Suburban division of Kolkata Police. Located at 58/A, Barrackpore Trunk Road, Kolkata-700002, it has jurisdiction over Cossipore neighbourhood/ Ward No. 1 of Kolkata Municipal Corporation.

Amherst Street Women police station covers all police districts under the jurisdiction of the North and North Suburban division i.e. Amherst Street, Jorabagan, Shyampukur, Cossipore, Chitpur, Sinthi, Burtolla and Tala.

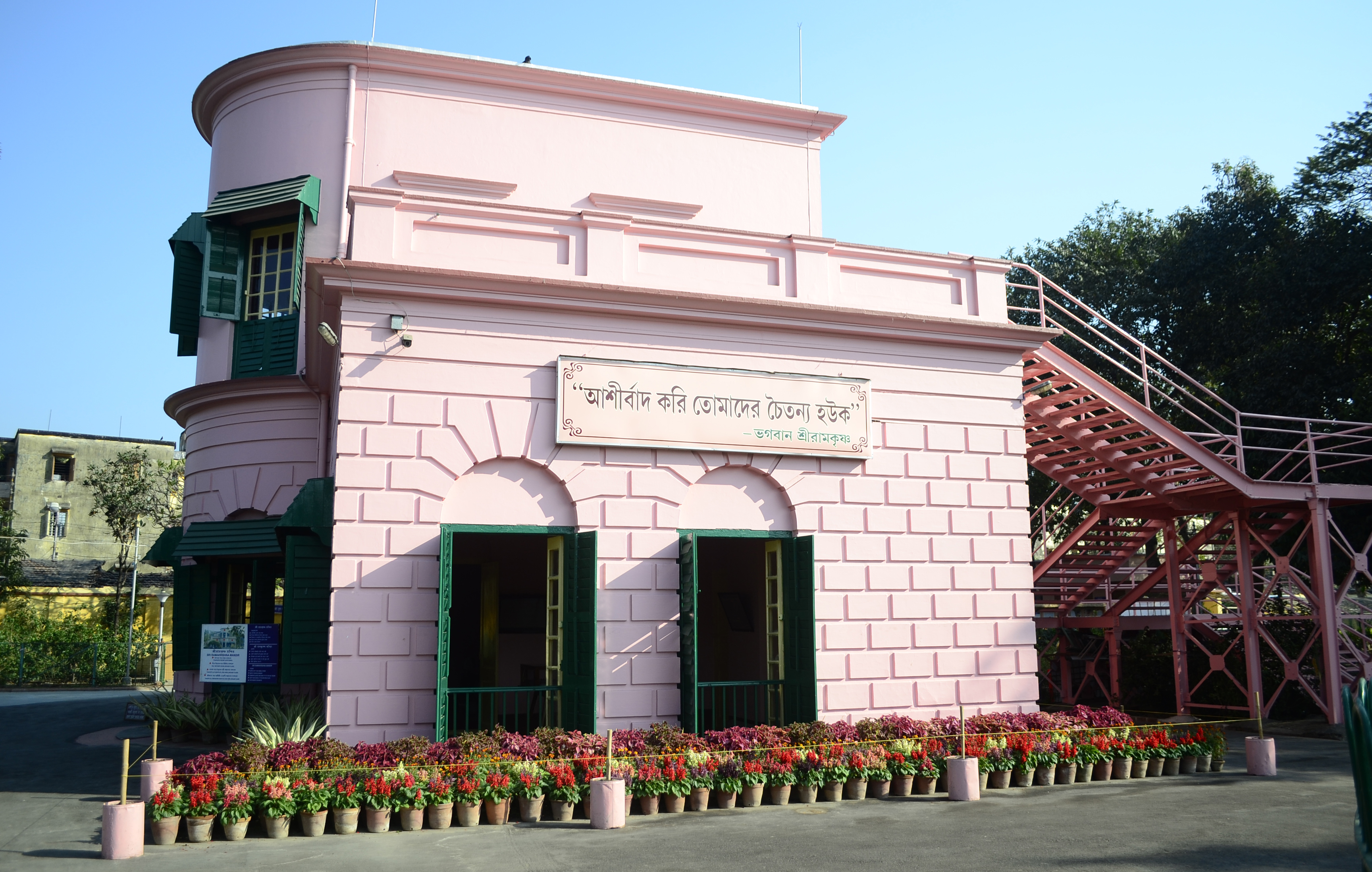
Cossipore Garden House or Cossipore Udyan Baati, where Ramakrishna Order was founded in 1886

== Transport ==
Cossipore Road (Sri Sri Ramakrishna Paramahansa Dev Sarani) is the artery of the area. The road is connected to B.T. Road (at Chiria More) with Khagendra Chatterjee Road.

=== Bus ===
==== Private Bus ====
- 34B Dunlop - Esplanade
- 43 Dakshineswar - Esplanade
- 242 Cossipore 4B - Esplanade

==== CSTC Bus ====
- S69 Cossipore - Santragachi
- S17A Ariadaha - Kudghat

=== Train ===
Kolkata Station (one of the major railway hub stations of the city) and Dum Dum Junction are the nearest railway stations. Tala railway station and Bagbazar railway station on Kolkata Circular Railway line are also located nearby.

== Cossipore Electric Generating Station ==
New Cossipore Generating station started producing electric for CESC from the year 1949 and has current capacity of 100 MW. This is older and uses non Pulverized Fuel to generate electricity. This unit plays a major part creating an economic eco system in its own. There are a lot of people live in Cossipore who are part of that ecosystem. But in 2015 it was closed.

== Gallery ==
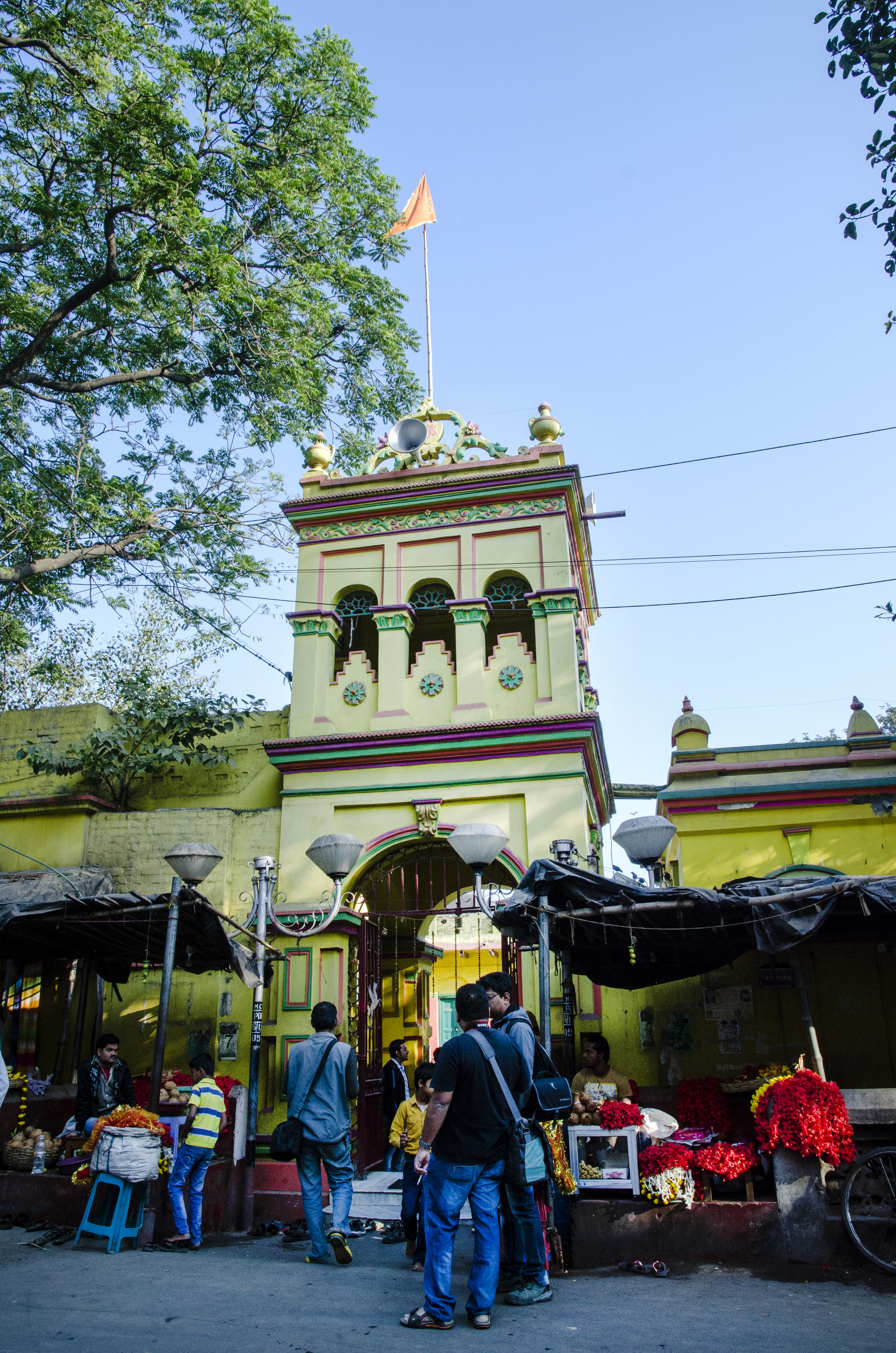
Sarbamangala Chitteshwari Temple, Cossipore

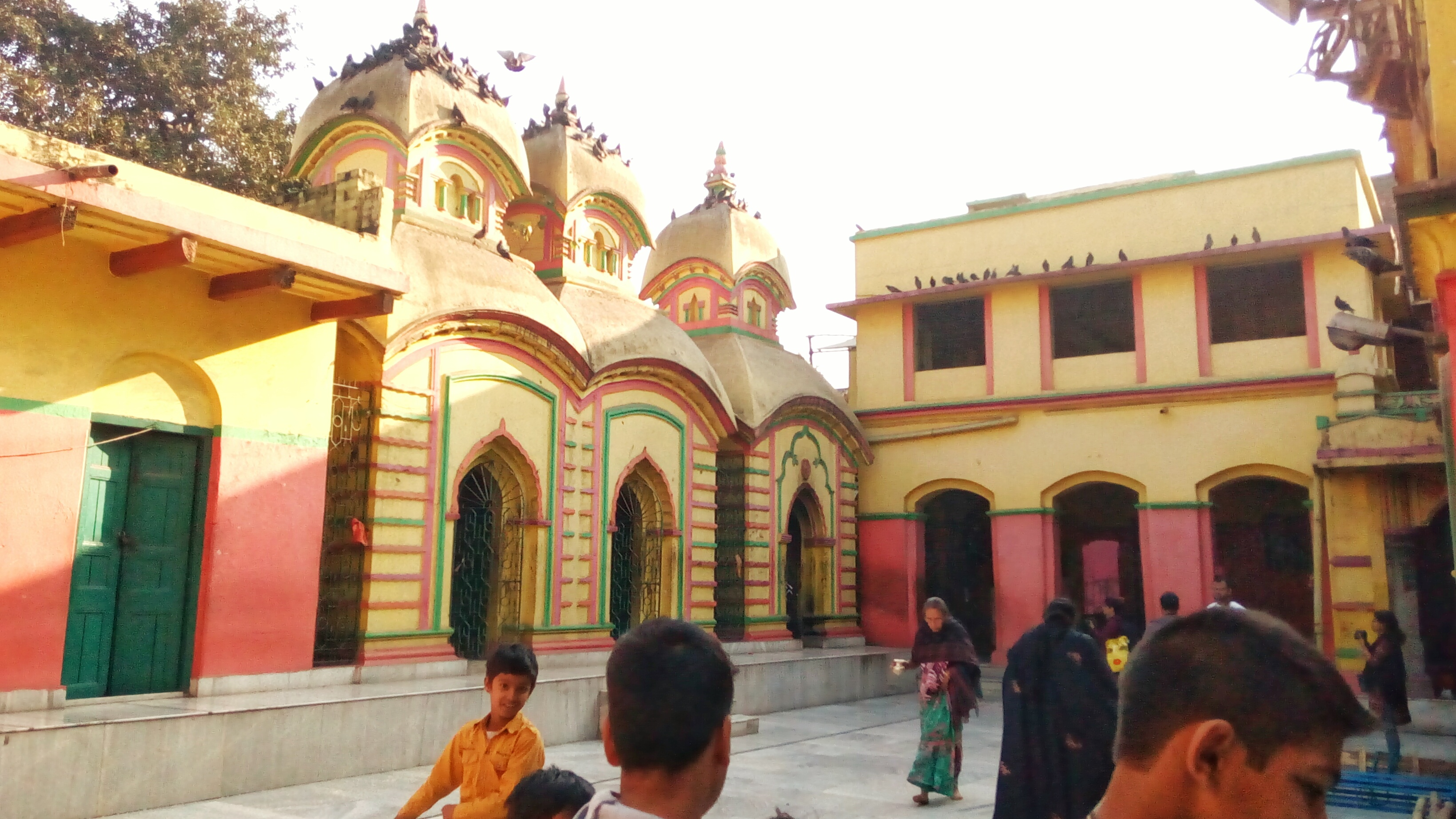
Sarbamangala Chitteshwari Temple Inside View

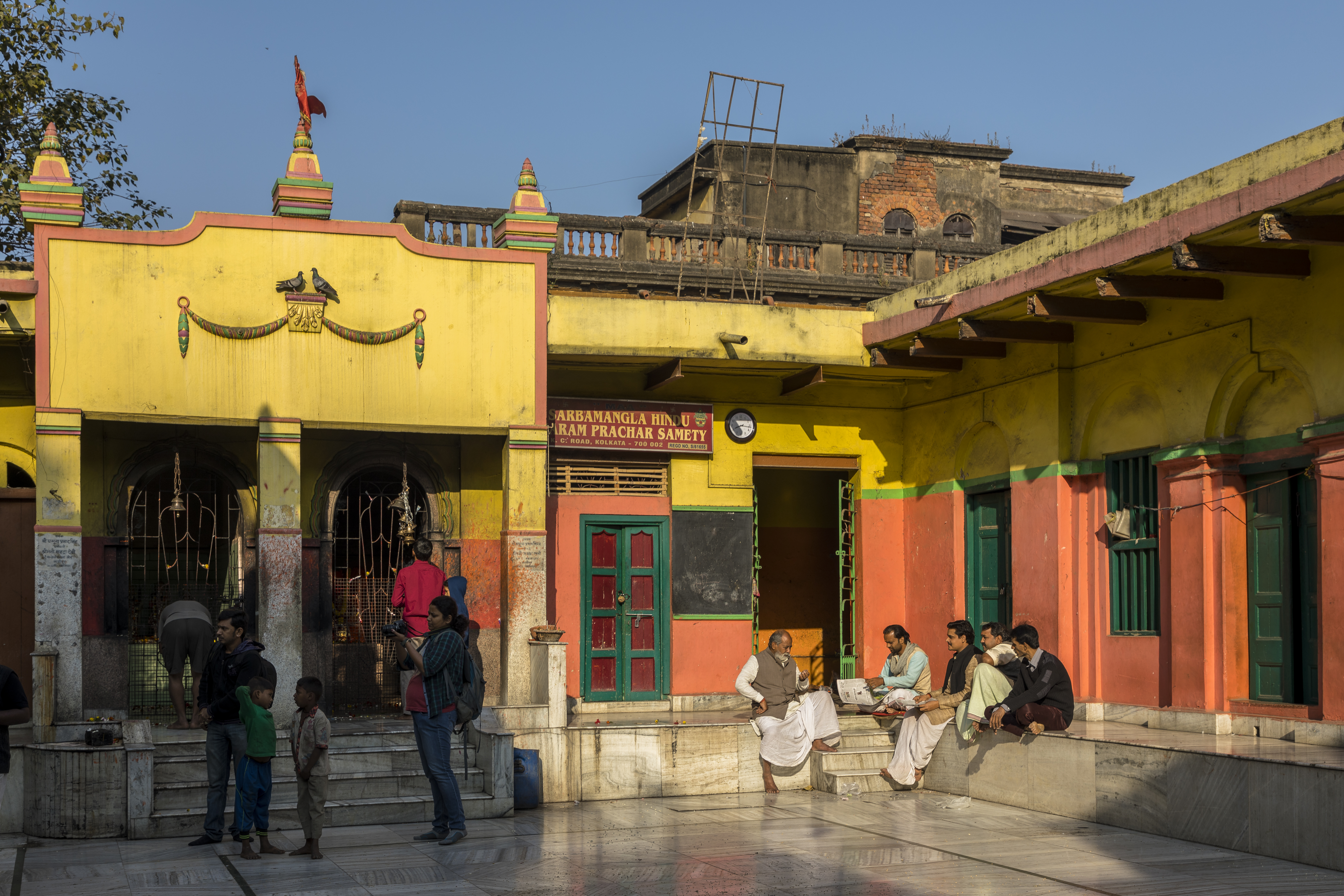
Sarbamangala Chitteshwari Temple Interior View

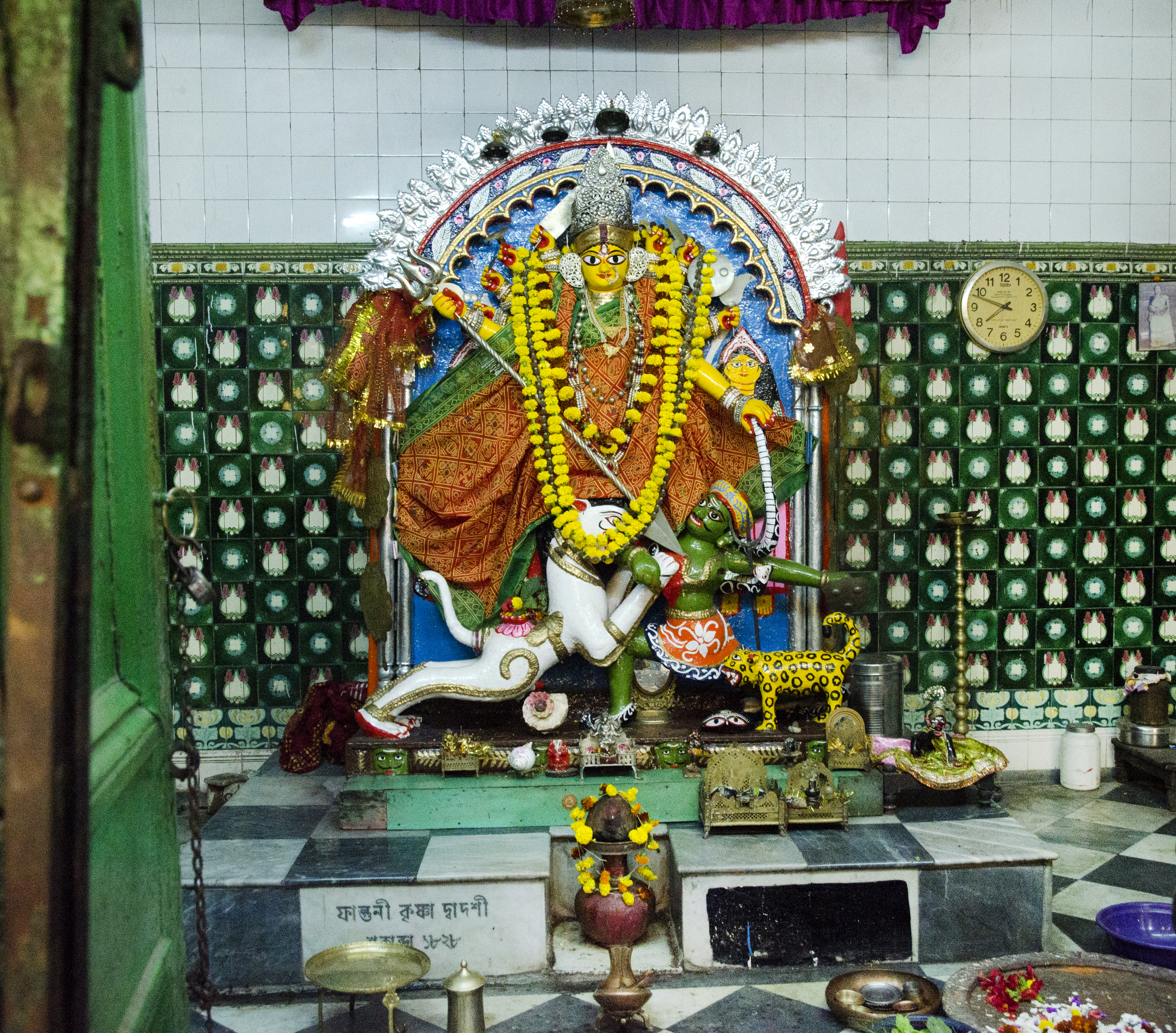
Durga Idol at Chitteswari Temple

Cossipore Garden House or Cossipore Udyan Baati, where Ramakrishna Paramhansa died on 16 August 1886

Sri Ramakrishna Samadhiprangan, the cremation area of Sri Ramakrishna in Cossipore

Sri Ramakrishna Paramahansa Samadhi inside Cossipore Burning Ghat
