= Atin Ghosh =

Indian politician

Deputy Mayor of Kolkata
- In office 28 December 2021 – 8 June 2026
- Mayor: Firhad Hakim
- Preceded by: Himself
- Constituency: Ward No. 11
- In office 22 November 2018 – 8 May 2020
- Mayor: Firhad Hakim
- Preceded by: Farzana Alam
- Succeeded by: Himself
- Constituency: Ward No. 11

Member of West Bengal Legislative Assembly
- In office 6 May 2021 – 7 May 2026
- Preceded by: Mala Saha
- Succeeded by: Ritesh Tiwari
- Constituency: Kashipur-Belgachhia

Personal details
- Born: Kolkata, West Bengal, India
- Party: Trinamool Congress

Atin Ghosh is an Indian politician who served as member of West Bengal Legislative Assembly from Kashipur-Belgachhia constituency from 6 May 2021 to 7 May 2026. He was the Deputy Mayor of Kolkata Municipal Corporation since 2018. He represents the Trinamool Congress.
