= Ritesh Tiwari =

Indian politician (born 1971)

Member of West Bengal Legislative Assembly for Kashipur-Belgachhia
- Incumbent
- Assumed office 4 May 2026
- Preceded by: Atin Ghosh (TMC)

Personal details
- Born: 14 June 1971 (age 55) Calcutta, West Bengal, India
- Party: Bharatiya Janata Party (since 1989)
- Education: University of Calcutta (B.A.)
- Occupation: Politician, social worker

Ritesh Tiwari (born 14 June 1971) is an Indian politician who has been elected to the West Bengal Legislative Assembly since 2026 from the Kashipur-Belgachhia constituency. Before that, he was the vice-president of Bharatiya Janata Party, West Bengal.

Tiwari was born in Kolkata on 14 June 1971. He currently resides in Cossipore, West Bengal. He has an undergraduate degree from the University of Calcutta in 2003. He joined the BJP in 1989. He was the vice-president of the state BJP in West Bengal. Previously, he contested in 2014 and 2016 from Chowrangee seat, but lost to Nyana Bandopadhyay twice.

In 2022, he was suspended for anti-party activities. Later in 2025, after Samik Bhattacharya became party president, Tiwari's suspension was revoked. In 2026, he won the Kashipur-Belgachhia Assembly constituency from the incumbent Atin Ghosh, who was the Kolkata's Deputy mayor, by a margin of 1681 votes.

== Controversy ==
In May 2026, following his election as the Bharatiya Janata Party (BJP) MLA for the Kashipur-Belgachia constituency in West Bengal, Tiwari announced that he would refuse to perform any developmental work and issue administrative certificates for the local Muslim community over the next five years. In a widely circulated video, Tiwari stated that no Muslim in his constituency had voted for him in the recent elections, asserting that he would not service those who did not support his candidature and referencing Prime Minister Narendra Modi's slogan by framing his decision as "settling accounts".

On 29 July 2026, the Kolkata Municipal Corporation (KMC) disconnected the water supply to public taps serving roughly 5,000 predominantly Muslim residents of Jyotinagar Colony in Cossipore, North Kolkata. The disconnection affected a 100 to 150 metre stretch of the colony while adjacent Hindu-inhabited areas retained water access, that forced residents to fetch drinking water from distant taps or rely on charity tankers and the polluted Hooghly River. Residents alleged that the utility cuts, along with a week-long electricity disruption, were a deliberate effort by authorities and local MLA Ritesh Tiwari to force their eviction from a 3,478 square metre plot owned by the Syama Prasad Mookerjee Port Trust. The port authority had issued an eviction order under the Public Premises (Eviction of Unauthorised Occupants) Act, 1971, while Tiwari denied involvement in the water cut and cited the property dispute. Represented by legal counsel, the residents filed a writ petition in the Calcutta High Court, which issued an interim order restraining authorities from taking coercive eviction steps against the colony's inhabitants.
