= Chowrangee Assembly constituency =

Constituency in Kolkata of the West Bengal Legislative Assembly, in India

Chowrangee
- Constituency No. 162 for the West Bengal Legislative Assembly
- Interactive Map Outlining Chowrangee Assembly Constituency

Constituency details
- Country: India
- Region: East India
- State: West Bengal
- District: Kolkata
- Lok Sabha constituency: Kolkata Uttar
- Established: 1957
- Total electors: 208,157
- Reservation: None

Member of Legislative Assembly
- 18th West Bengal Legislative Assembly
- Incumbent Nayna Bandyopadhyay
- Party: MAITC
- Alliance: MAITC+
- Elected year: 2026

Chowrangee Assembly constituency is a Legislative Assembly constituency of Kolkata district in the Indian state of West Bengal. Located at the heart of Kolkata, the capital city of the state, this has been a bastion of Trinamool Congress since the party's formation. Earlier, it was a stronghold of Indian National Congress, from which party two chief ministers, Bidhan Chandra Roy and Siddhartha Shankar Ray, had been elected to the West Bengal Legislative Assembly.

== Overview ==
As per order of the Delimitation Commission in respect of the Delimitation of constituencies in the West Bengal, Chowrangee Assembly constituency is composed of the following:

- Ward Nos. 44, 45, 46, 47, 48, 49, 50, 51, 52, 53 and 62 of Kolkata Municipal Corporation.

Borough	Ward No.	Councillor	2021 Winner
V	44	Rehana Khatoon	Trinamool Congress
V	45	Santosh Kumar Pathak	Bharatiya Janata Party
VI	46	Priyanka Saha	Trinamool Congress
VI	47	Bimal Singh	Trinamool Congress
V	48	Biswarup Dey	Trinamool Congress
V	49	Monalisa Banerjee	Trinamool Congress
V	50	Sajal Ghosh	Bharatiya Janata Party
VI	51	Indranil Kumar	Trinamool Congress
VI	52	Sohini Mukherjee	Trinamool Congress
VI	53	Indrani Saha Banerjee	Trinamool Congress
VI	62	Sana Ahmed	Trinamool Congress

Chowrangee Assembly constituency is part of No. 24 Kolkata Uttar Lok Sabha constituency.

== Members of the Legislative Assembly ==
Year	Name	Party
1957	Bijoy Singh Nahar	Indian National Congress
1962	Dr. Bidhan Chandra Roy	Indian National Congress
1967	Siddhartha Shankar Ray	Indian National Congress
1969	Siddhartha Shankar Ray	Indian National Congress
1971	Sankar Ghose	Indian National Congress
1972	Sankar Ghose	Indian National Congress
1977	Sandip Das	Janata Party
1982	Sisir Kumar Bose	Indian National Congress
1987	Debi Prasad Chattopadhyay	Indian National Congress
1991	Siddhartha Shankar Ray	Indian National Congress
1993^	Anil Chatterjee	Communist Party of India (Marxist)
1996	Subrata Mukherjee	Indian National Congress
2001	Subrata Mukherjee	Trinamool Congress
2006	Subrata Bakshi	Trinamool Congress
2011	Sikha Chowdhury	Trinamool Congress
2014^	Nayna Bandyopadhyay	Trinamool Congress
2016	Nayna Bandyopadhyay	Trinamool Congress
2021	Nayna Bandyopadhyay	Trinamool Congress
2026	Nayna Bandyopadhyay	Trinamool Congress

- ^ denotes by-election

== Election results ==
=== 2026 ===
2026 West Bengal Legislative Assembly election: Chowrangee
Party	Candidate	Votes	%	±%
AITC	Nayna Bandyopadhyay	62,938	57.15	▼5.72
BJP	Santosh Kumar Pathak	40,936	37.17	▲14.97
RCPI	Sanjay Basu	2,602	2.36	
INC	Manash Sarkar	2,117	1.92	▼10.88
SUCI(C)	Prabir Seal	178	0.16	
Independent	Sayantan Patra	118	0.11	
Independent	Tejash Bhole	115	0.10	
RRP	Debasish Bhadra	111	0.10	
Independent	Sumanta Bhowmick	76	0.07	
Independent	MD Ehsan Elahi	65	0.06	
Independent	Johar Iqbal	34	0.03	
NOTA	None of the above	832	0.76	▼0.33
Majority		22,002	19.98	▼20.69
Turnout		110,122	86.91	▲33.36
AITC hold		Swing		

=== 2021 ===
2021 West Bengal Legislative Assembly election: Chowrangee
Party	Candidate	Votes	%	±%
AITC	Nayna Bandyopadhyay	70,101	62.87	
BJP	Devdutta Maji	24,757	22.2	
INC	Santosh Kumar Pathak	14,266	12.8	
NOTA	None of the above	1,212	1.09	
Majority		45,344	40.67	
Turnout		111,493	53.55	
AITC hold		Swing	+	

=== 2016 ===
2016 West Bengal Legislative Assembly election: Chowrangee
Party	Candidate	Votes	%	±%
AITC	Nayna Bandyopadhyay	55,119	47.29	+7.15
INC	Somen Mitra	41,903	36.95	+12.53
BJP	Ritesh Tiwari	15,707	13.48	−11.64
None of the Above	None of the Above	2,183	1.87	New
SUCI(C)	Kartik Kumkar	612	0.53	
Majority		13,216	10.34	−4.68
Turnout		1,16,557	56.20	+8.51
AITC hold		Swing	+7.15	

=== 2014 by-election ===
A by-election was held on 13 September 2014 following the resignation of the sitting MLA, Shikha Chowdhury who switched over from Trinamool Congress to Congress.

By-election, 2014: Chowrangee
Party	Candidate	Votes	%	±%
AITC	Nayna Bandyopadhyay	38,328	40.14	−31.76
BJP	Ritesh Tiwari	23,984	25.12	+20.78
INC	Santosh Kumar Pathak	23,317	24.42	New
CPI(M)	Faiyaz Ahmed Khan	8,890	9.09	New
Majority		14,344	15.02	−37.23
Turnout		96,650	47.69	−4.56
AITC hold		Swing	-31.76	

=== 2011 ===
2011 West Bengal Legislative Assembly election: Chowrangee
Party	Candidate	Votes	%	±%
AITC	Sikha Chowdhury	79,450	71.90	
RJD	Bimal Singh	21,711	19.65	
BJP	Shahnawaz Ahmed	4,799	4.34	
AIMF	Abdul Wahab	1,640	1.48	
Majority		57,739	52.25	
Turnout		1,10,506	54.42	
AITC win				

=== 2006 ===
2006 West Bengal Legislative Assembly election: Chowringhee
Party	Candidate	Votes	%	±%
AITC	Subrata Bakshi	23,000	38.19	
CPI(M)	Narayan Jain	20,790	34.52	
INC	Subrata Mukherjee	15,213	25.26	
IND	Raghunath Bhowmick	437	0.73	
IJP	Karan Singh	200	0.33	
IND	Pannalal Chowdhury	198	0.33	
IND	Md. Mustafa	138	0.23	
IND	Biswanath Potodeia	136	0.23	
IND	Aditya Neogi	113	0.19	
Majority		2,210	3.67	
Turnout		60,225		
AITC hold		Swing		

=== 2001 ===
2001 West Bengal Legislative Assembly election: Chowringhee
Party	Candidate	Votes	%	±%
AITC	Subrata Mukherjee	39,728	66.58	
JD(S)	Zahid Hossain	14,367	24.08	
IND	Md. Iqbal	1,996	3.35	
IND	Ramendra Pandey	953	1.60	
IND	Pannalal Chowdhury	592	0.99	
IND	Agarwal Mohanlal	486	0.81	
IND	Vijay Gaur	468	0.78	
IND	Bhim Singh Verma	445	0.75	
IND	Piyali Bhattacharya	435	0.73	
IND	Omprakash Pandey	199	0.33	
Majority		25,361	42.50	
Turnout		59,671	42.14	
Swing to AITC from INC		Swing		

=== 1996 ===
1996 West Bengal Legislative Assembly election: Chowringhee
Party	Candidate	Votes	%	±%
INC	Subrata Mukherjee	48,648	60.62	
JD	Paul Mantosh	19,968	24.88	
BJP	Mrinal Kanti Das	9,551	11.90	
BMSM	M. E. Chand	1,228	1.53	
IND	Sakal Deo Sharma	341	0.42	
IND	Ramendra Pandey	200	0.25	
IND	Vijay Gaur	181	0.23	
IUML	Md. Asif Hussain	137	0.17	
Majority		28,680	35.74	
Turnout		82,532	60.78	
Swing to INC from CPI(M)		Swing		

=== 1991 ===
1991 West Bengal Legislative Assembly election: Chowringhee
Party	Candidate	Votes	%	±%
INC	Siddhartha Shanker Ray	38,866	55.75	
CPI(M)	Ashok Mitra	22,033	31.60	
BJP	Sabyasachi Bagchi	8,339	11.96	
IND	Sakkal Deb Sharma	183	0.26	
IND	Rajranchhor Chand Bhandari	83	0.12	
IND	M. E. Chand	81	0.12	
IND	Vijay Kumar Gaur	54	0.08	
IND	Arun Biswas	48	0.07	
IND	Surendra Nath Mitra	30	0.04	
Majority		16,833	24.15	
Turnout		71,247	56.98	
INC hold		Swing		

=== 1987 ===
1987 West Bengal Legislative Assembly election: Chowringhee
Party	Candidate	Votes	%	±%
INC	Debi Prasad Chattopadhyay	39,361	62.24	
CPI(M)	Badsa Alam	21,867	34.58	
IND	Sisir Kumar Basu	1,648	2.61	
IND	Gopal Ghosh	157	0.25	
IND	Ram Murti Singh	123	0.19	
IND	Subrata Das	80	0.13	
Majority		17,494	27.66	
Turnout		64,408	59.69	
INC hold		Swing		

=== 1982 ===
1982 West Bengal Legislative Assembly election: Chowringhee
Party	Candidate	Votes	%	±%
INC	Sisir Kumar Bose	30,316	55.69	
CPI(M)	Zahurul Hoque	20,063	36.86	
JP	Sandip Das	1,268	2.33	
IND	Lachman Das Daswani	1,232	2.26	
BJP	Benoy Sankar Sinha Roy	728	1.34	
IND	Pravash Chandra Shyam	504	0.93	
IND	Nawab Khan Waryah	249	0.46	
IND	Ananga Mohan Ash	74	0.14	
Majority		10,253	18.83	
Turnout		55,618	55.89	
Swing to INC from JP		Swing		

=== 1977 ===
1977 West Bengal Legislative Assembly election: Chowringhee
Party	Candidate	Votes	%	±%
JP	Sandip Das	14,166	38.78	
CPI(M)	Amal Datta	11,995	32.83	
INC	Prasanta Behari Mukherjee	9,604	26.29	
IND	Quamuddin Ahmed	284	0.78	
IND	Dhirendra Ghosh	241	0.66	
IND	Sudhir Bera	158	0.43	
IND	Karuna Nidhan Roy	85	0.23	
Majority		2,171	5.95	
Turnout		37,103	38.74	
Swing to JP from INC		Swing		

=== 1972 ===
1972 West Bengal Legislative Assembly election: Chowringhee
Party	Candidate	Votes	%	±%
INC	Sankar Ghose	23,654	70.60	
CPI(M)	Amal Dutta	9,851	29.40	
Majority		13,803	41.20	
Turnout		34,278	47.21	
INC hold		Swing		

=== 1971 ===
1971 West Bengal Legislative Assembly election: Chowringhee
Party	Candidate	Votes	%	±%
INC	Sankar Ghose	16,363	54.13	
CPI(M)	Parbati Prasanna Basu	7,862	26.01	
INC(O)	Asoka Krishna Dutt	4,259	14.09	
AIFB	Md. Yakub	1,743	5.77	
Majority		8,501	28.12	
Turnout		31,603	44.14	
INC hold		Swing		

=== 1969 ===
1969 West Bengal Legislative Assembly election: Chowringhee
Party	Candidate	Votes	%	±%
INC	Siddhartha Shankar Ray	20,937	57.83	
IND	Akantalal Singh	15,268	42.17	
Majority		5,669	15.66	
Turnout		36,915	55.72	
INC hold		Swing		

=== 1967 ===
1967 West Bengal Legislative Assembly election: Chowringhee
Party	Candidate	Votes	%	±%
INC	S. S. Ray	22,954	62.27	
CPI(M)	S. Gupta	11,658	31.62	
ABJS	G. A. W. Roze	2,252	6.11	
Majority		11,296	30.65	
Turnout		38,035	57.47	
INC hold		Swing		

=== 1962 ===
1962 West Bengal Legislative Assembly election: Chowringhee
Party	Candidate	Votes	%	±%
INC	Bidhan Chandra Roy	22,556	72.08	
CPI	Biswanath Mukherjee	7,390	23.62	
IND	Kazi Mohammad Ali	758	2.42	
SWA	Ajit Kumar Majumdar	305	0.97	
ABJS	Amal Ray	282	0.90	
Majority		15,166	48.46	
Turnout		32,088	61.07	
INC hold		Swing		

=== 1957 ===
1957 West Bengal Legislative Assembly election: Chowringhee
Party	Candidate	Votes	%	±%
INC	Bijoy Singh Nahar	15,019	69.61	
PSP	Hazi Md. Ariff	5,869	27.20	
IND	Shamsul Haq	688	3.19	
Majority		9,150	42.41	
Turnout		21,576	42.37	
INC win (new seat)				
