= Kashipur-Belgachhia Assembly constituency =

Constituency of the West Bengal Legislative Assembly, in India

Kashipur–Belgachhia
- Constituency No. 168 for the West Bengal Legislative Assembly
- Interactive Map Outlining Kashipur Belgachhia Assembly Constituency

Constituency details
- Country: India
- Region: East India
- State: West Bengal
- District: Kolkata
- Lok Sabha constituency: Kolkata Uttar
- Established: 1951
- Total electors: 223,702
- Reservation: None

Member of Legislative Assembly
- 18th West Bengal Legislative Assembly
- Incumbent Ritesh Tiwari
- Party: Bharatiya Janata Party
- Elected year: 2026

Kashipur–Belgachhia Assembly constituency is a Legislative Assembly constituency of Kolkata district in the Indian state of West Bengal.

== Overview ==
As per order of the Delimitation Commission in respect of the Delimitation of constituencies in the West Bengal, Kashipur-Belgachhia Assembly constituency is composed of the following:

- Ward Nos. 1, 2, 3, 4, 5 and 6 of Kolkata Municipal Corporation.

Borough	Ward No.	Councillor	2021 Winner
I	1	Kartick Chandra Manna	Trinamool Congress
I	2	Kakali Sen	Trinamool Congress
I	3	Debika Chakraborty	Trinamool Congress
I	4	Goutam Haldar	Trinamool Congress
I	5	Tarun Saha	Trinamool Congress
I	6	Suman Singh	Trinamool Congress

Kashipur Belgachhia Assembly constituency is part of No. 24 Kolkata Uttar Lok Sabha constituency.

== Members of the Legislative Assembly ==
Year	Name	Party
1952	Biswanath Roy	Indian National Congress
1957	Deben Sen	Praja Socialist Party
1962	Sunil Kumar Dasgupta	Indian National Congress
1967	S.K. Roy	Indian National Congress
1969	Vishnu Gopal Basu	Communist Party of India (Marxist)
1971	Prafulla Kanti Ghosh	Indian National Congress
1972	Prafulla Kanti Ghosh	Indian National Congress
1977	Buddhadeb Bhattacharjee	Communist Party of India (Marxist)
1982	Prafulla Kanti Ghosh	Indian National Congress
1987	Dipak Chanda	Communist Party of India (Marxist)
1991	Dipak Chanda	Communist Party of India (Marxist)
1996	Tarak Bandyopadhyay	Indian National Congress
2001	Tarak Bandyopadhyay	Trinamool Congress
2006	Tarak Bandyopadhyay	Trinamool Congress
2011	Mala Saha	Trinamool Congress
2016	Mala Saha	Trinamool Congress
2021	Atin Ghosh	Trinamool Congress
2026	Ritesh Tiwari	Bharatiya Janata Party

== Election results ==
=== 2026 ===
2026 West Bengal Legislative Assembly election: Kashipur-Belgachhia
Party	Candidate	Votes	%	±%
BJP	Ritesh Tiwari	68,368	45.41	▲15.17
AITC	Atin Ghosh	66,717	44.32	▼12.16
CPI(M)	Rajinder Gupta	11,151	7.41	▼3.53
NOTA	None of the above	1,250	0.83	▼0.34
Majority		1,651	1.09	▼25.15
Turnout		150,542	89.6	▲29.31
BJP gain from AITC		Swing		

=== 2021 ===
2021 West Bengal Legislative Assembly election: Cossipore-Belgachhia
Party	Candidate	Votes	%	±%
AITC	Atin Ghosh	76,182	56.48	
BJP	Shibaji Singha Roy	40,792	30.24	
CPI(M)	Pratip Dasgupta	14,757	10.94	
NOTA	None of the above	1,577	1.17	
Majority		35,390	26.24	
Turnout		134,872	60.29	
AITC hold		Swing		

=== 2016 ===
2016 West Bengal Legislative Assembly election: Cossipore-Belgachhia
Party	Candidate	Votes	%	±%
AITC	Mala Saha	72,264	50.40	−11.28
CPI(M)	Kaninika Ghosh Bose	46,454	32.40	−0.85
BJP	Aditya Tandon	19,293	13.45	+10.33
None of the Above	None of the Above	2,646	1.84	New
BSP	Md Azimullah	989	0.69	
Majority		25,810	18.00	−10.43
Turnout		1,43,391	64.84	−2.46
AITC hold		Swing	-11.28	

=== 2011 ===
2011 West Bengal Legislative Assembly election: Cossipore-Belgachhia
Party	Candidate	Votes	%	±%
AITC	Mala Saha	87,408	61.68	
CPI(M)	Kaninika Ghosh Bose	47,124	33.25	
BJP	Aditya Tandon	4,420	3.12	
BSP	Rakesh Kumar Kori	1,241	0.88	
Majority		40,284	28.43	
Turnout		1,41,721	67.30	
AITC win				
