= Kolkata district =

District in West Bengal, India

Kolkata district Calcutta district
- District of West Bengal
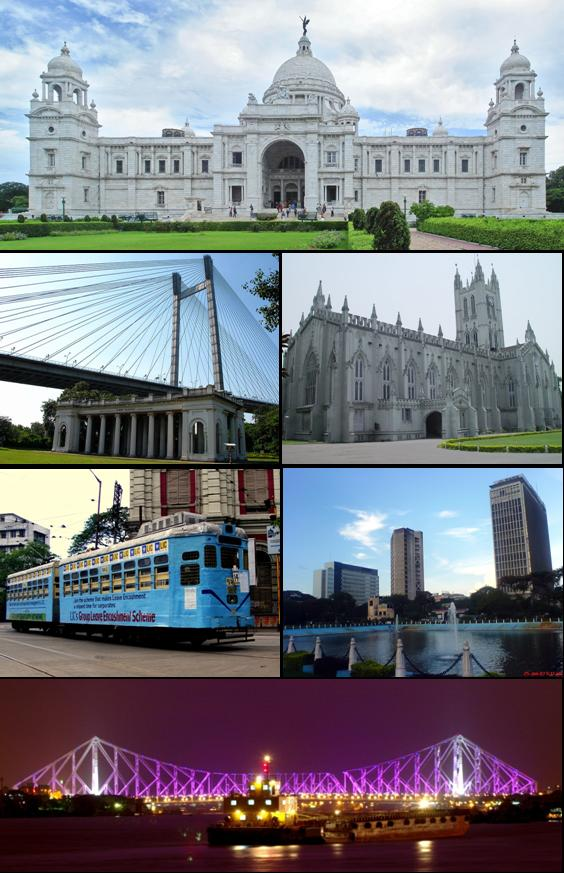
- Clockwise from top: Victoria Memorial, St. Paul's Cathedral, Central Business District, Rabindra Setu, City Tram Line, Vidyasagar Setu

- Location of Kolkata district in West Bengal
- Coordinates: 22°34′22″N 88°21′50″E
- Country: India
- State: West Bengal
- Division: Presidency
- Headquarters: Kolkata

Government
  - Lok Sabha constituencies: Kolkata Uttar, Kolkata Dakshin, Diamond Harbour
  - Vidhan Sabha constituencies: Chowrangee, Entally, Beleghata, Jorasanko, Shyampukur, Maniktala, Kashipur-Belgachhia, Kasba, Behala Purba, Behala Paschim, Kolkata Port, Bhabanipur, Rashbehari, Ballygunge, Metiaburuz

Area
  - Total: 206.08 km^{2} (79.57 sq mi)

Population (2011)
  - Total: 4,496,694
  - Density: 21,820/km^{2} (56,514/sq mi)

Demographics
  - Literacy: 98.67 per cent
  - Sex ratio: 990 ♂/♀

Languages
  - Official: Bengali
  - Additional official: English
- Time zone: UTC+05:30 (IST)
- Website: www.kmcgov.in

Kolkata district (formerly known as Calcutta district) is a district in the Indian state of West Bengal. It only contains the entire city proper of Kolkata, the capital city of the state and therefore it is a city district. It is the smallest district in the state and also the most densely populated district. Being a city district, the district itself is its own headquarters; it does not have further subdivisions like mahakumas or blocks that exist in all other districts of the state nor does it have a district magistrate.

== History ==
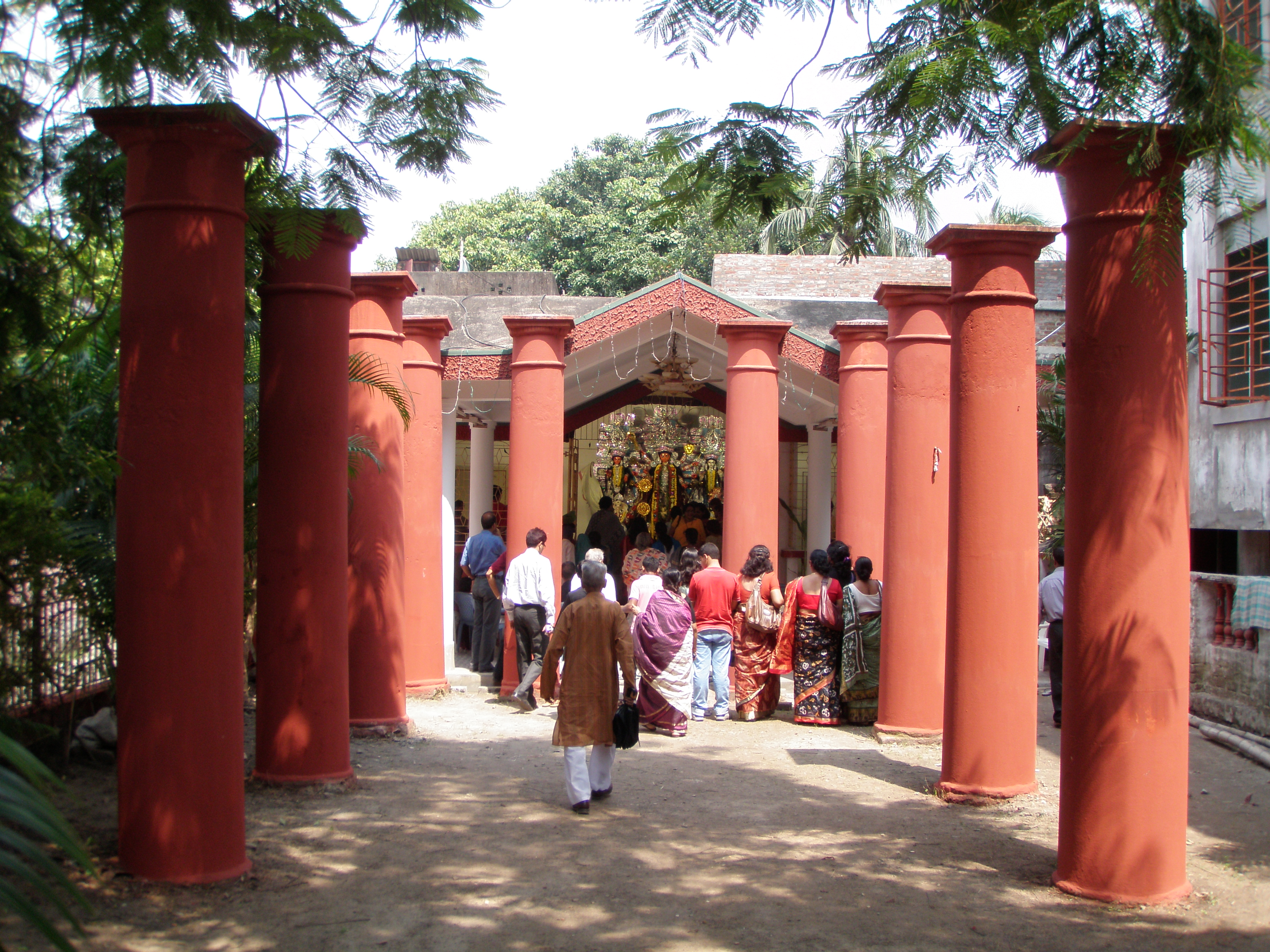
The remains of the Aatchala Bari at Barisha

During seventeenth century Sutanuti was a major wool-trading center where had flourished the Basak, Sett, and a group of Portuguese merchants. In Dihi Kalikata, Armenian traders commanded significant influence. The first historical notice regarding Kolkata was found in Ain-i-Akbari of Abul Fazl in 1596. According to it, that Kalighat was a place within Saptagram, an old port on Hooghly River. With the decline of the once flourishing Saptagram port, traders and businessmen, such as the Basaks, the Sheths and others, started venturing southwards and settled in or developed places such as Gobindapur. They set up a cotton and yarn market at Sutanuti. Chitpur was a weaving centre and Baranagar was another textile centre. Kalighat was a pilgrimage centre. Across the Hooghly, there were places such as Salkia and Betor. Kalikata was a lesser known place. While both Sutanuti and Gobindapur appear on old maps like Thomas Bowrey's of 1687 and George Herron's of 1690, Kalikata, situated between the two, is not depicted.

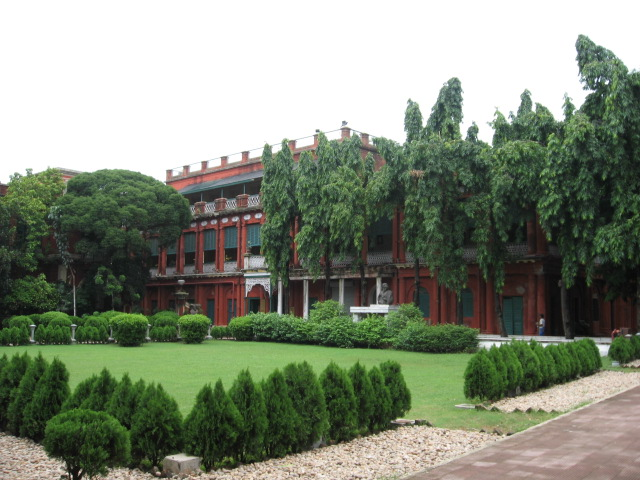
Jorasanko Thakur Bari, now Rabindra Bharati University

Around early March 1698, the East India Company (EIC) proposed to the Roy Choudhurys that Dihi Kalikata be subrented to them. The offer was rejected since then-Zamindar (anon.) of the Roy Chowdhurys feared permanently losing the properties to a far-powerful client. This led the EIC to negotiate for the rent-rights outright and at the Mughal quarters; one Nathaniel Walsh was dispatched to Prince Azim-ush-Shan, then-Viceroy of Bengal Subah. The negotiations proved successful. The zamindari rights, for Dihi Kalikata, Sutanuti and Govindapur, had been transferred to the Company paying Choudhury total of 2000 Rupees. Subsequent to the fall of Siraj-ud-daulah, the last independent Nawab of Bengal, the English purchased 55 villages in 1758 from Mir Jafar. These villages were known en-bloc as Dihi Panchannagram.

After the Treaty of Allahabad, the East India Company was granted Diwani rights (the right to collect taxes), in 1765, in the eastern province of Bengal-Bihar-Odisha. In 1772, Kolkata became the capital of East India Company's territories, and in 1793, the English took full control of the city and the province. Development of Kolkata's infrastructure started and in the early 19th century, the marshes surrounding the city were drained. In the 19th century, Kolkata was the epicentre of the epoch-changing socio-cultural movement, the Bengal Renaissance. The 20th century unfolded historical events in Kolkata – the Swadeshi movement, the first partition of Bengal along communal lines, shifting of the national capital from Kolkata to Delhi in 1911 – and Kolkata emerged as an important hub of the independence movement. With the experience and memories of the Bengal famine of 1943, the Great Calcutta Killings, the final partition of Bengal, and independence of the country, Kolkata moved on to a new era of challenges, with millions of refugees pouring in from neighbouring East Pakistan (later Bangladesh).

Before partition of Bengal, Kolkata had offered education and job opportunities to the people from East Bengal. Kolkata had taken in about a quarter of a million East Bengali migrants long before partition. After partition of Bengal, the number of refugees moving in from East Bengal were so high that large stretches of rural or semi urban habitation were transformed into towns, the density of population, particularly in areas with high refugee population, jumped by leaps. The outer limits of Kolkata were extended. The entire process of urbanisation was hastened. In the fifties 25% of the population of Metropolitan Kolkata were refugees. In 1975, a CMDA report suggested that there were 1,104 squatter colonies in West Bengal, out of which 510 were in Calcutta Metropolitan District. In 1981, a refugee rehabilitation committee set up by the state government put the figures for refugees in the state at 8 million. The break up for Kolkata is not available. The central government had decided that 25 March 1971 was the cut off date for entry of refugees from former East Pakistan into India and so, all those coming in after that date are either immigrants or infiltrators – there were no more refugees, at least officially/legally.

The socio-economic conditions that led to the growth of Kolkata, were urbanising a much larger territory. Right form the 16th century, a number of townships, based on trade and commerce, had sprung up along both banks of the Hooghly. None of these townships withered away as Kolkata gained supremacy, rather they got integrated with the core of the city. In 1951, census operations in West Bengal first recognised a continuous industrial area stretching from Bansberia to Uluberia on the west bank of the Hooghly, and from Kalyani to Budge Budge on the east bank. It was ultimately recognised as the Kolkata urban agglomeration, with the city as its core.

Kolkata has always been a city of migrants. They are the people who have made the city so large. In the first half of the 20th century the largest group of migrants were the working-class people from Bihar. After 1947, they were overtaken in numbers by the refugees from East Pakistan. A comparatively lesser number of people from the surrounding areas have migrated to the city, because a huge population commutes to the city for work and returns to their villages. They are not counted in the census data for Kolkata. The promise of a better quality of life may have been an initial attraction for the migrants, but bulk of the poorer sections soon realised that poverty in Kolkata was as severe and dehumanising as in the villages they left behind. However, many of them found opportunities of income in the urban economy. Some of them managed a place in industry, because of the preferential treatment they got as a result of people in their community vouching for them. A 1976 survey revealed that the proportion of workers from outside West Bengal were 71% in the jute industry, 58% in textile mills and 73% in iron and steel units. The Chamars from the Hindi heartland, many of whom work in the leather industry, have been here for more than a century. As per the 1951 census, only 33.2% of Kolkata's inhabitants were city-born. The rest, including a small group of foreigners, were migrants. 12.3% came from elsewhere in West Bengal, 26.3% from other states in India and 29.6% were refugees from East Pakistan.

This brings us on to another aspect of the city. The slum population has grown at a much faster rate than the total city population, thereby indicating a growing ratio of the impoverished working population of the city. "Geographically, Calcutta is in a unique position vis-à-vis the whole of eastern India. The growth and prosperity of the region must involve Calcutta. How it will grow… is the great question to be answered."

P. Thankappan Nair writes, “The six square miles within the Maratha Ditch (the original core of Calcutta) thus came to have the world’s highest density of population in that age. It was a heterogeneous population, sinking differences of caste, creed and colour under the sheer compulsion to interact and survive together. The compulsion has grown stronger ever since, as has the spirit it fostered. Hence Calcutta did not disintegrate when the capital was shifted to New Delhi in 1912. It has kept growing and living by the ever-renewed confidence and vitality of its inherent human forces.”

== Geography ==
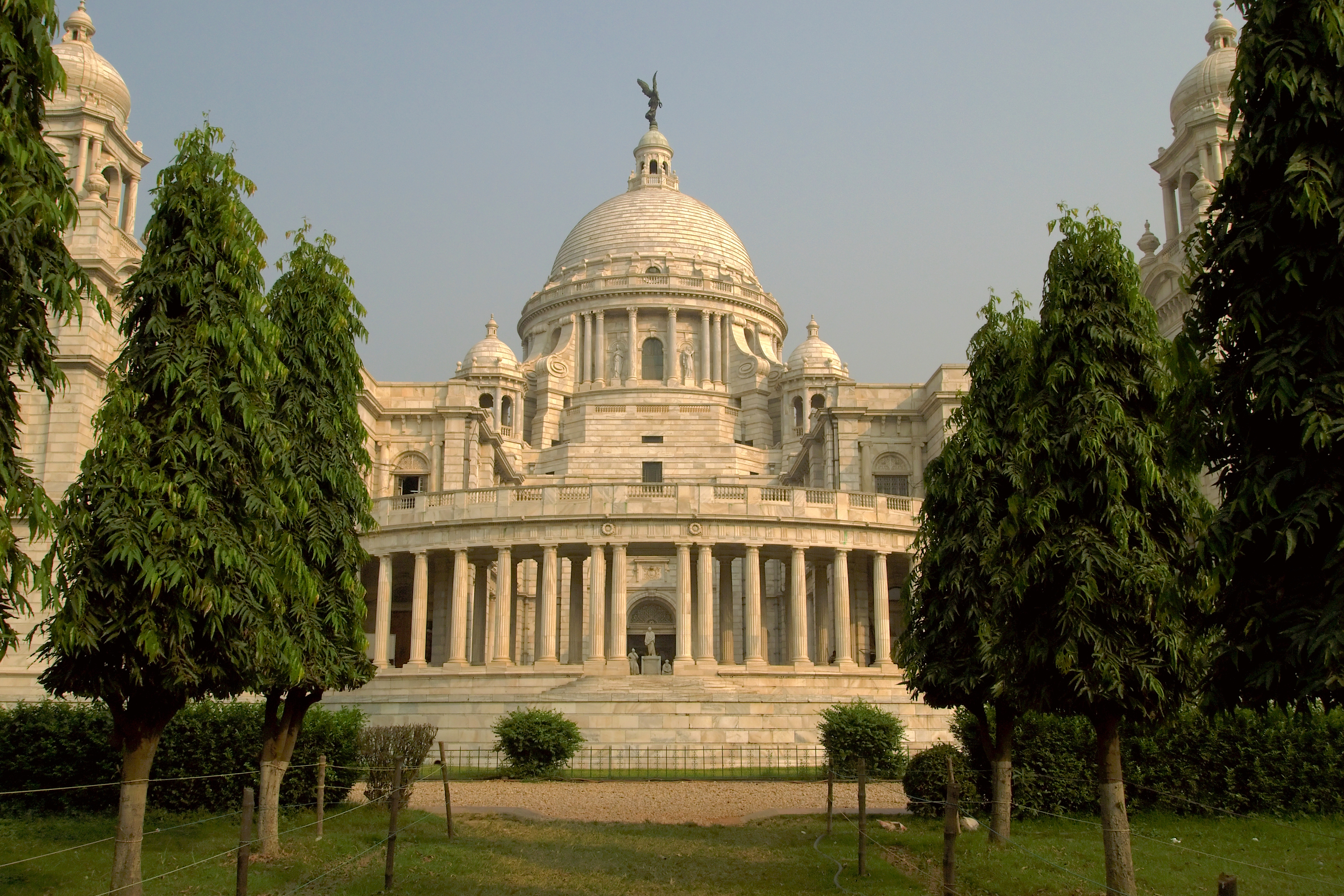
Victoria Memorial

Kolkata district lies between 22.037’ and 22.030’ North latitude and 88.023’ and 88.018’ East longitude. It occupies the east bank of the Hooghly in the lower Ganges Delta. The alluvial plain has an average elevation of 6.4 metres (17 feet) above mean sea level. A large part of the district comprises land reclaimed from wetland. The existing East Kolkata Wetlands has been designated a “wetland of international importance” by the Ramsar Convention.

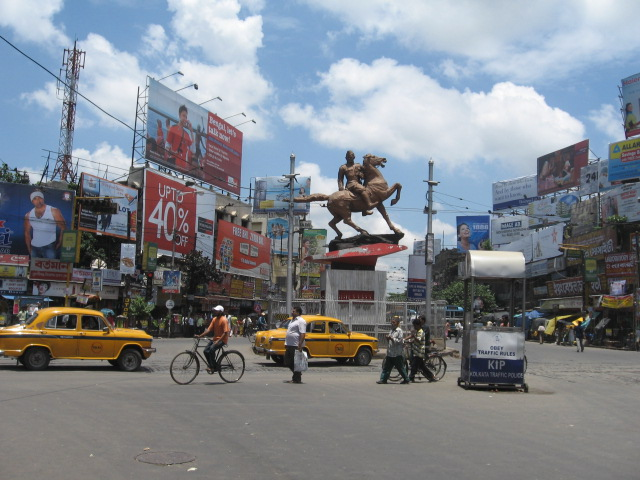
Shyambazar five point crossing with statue of Netaji Subhas

Kolkata district is bounded by the North 24 Parganas district on the north and on the east, South 24 Parganas district on the south and Howrah district, across the Hooghly, on the west.

In terms of area, it is the smallest amongst all the districts of West Bengal but has the highest density of population. It is the only district in the state with cent per cent urban population. It has the lowest Scheduled Caste (5.38%) and Scheduled Tribe (0.24%) population in the state. Kolkata district is the only district in the state with a negative growth rate (−1.7%) for the 2001–2011 decade. Kolkata district has the second highest literacy rate (86.3%) in the state.

Kolkata metropolitan area, extending over an area of 1851.41 km^{2}, is one of the six metropolitan areas in India. It includes the entire Kolkata Municipal Corporation area.

The Kolkata district collector is responsible for several citizen centric services which are neither being provided by the KMC nor Kolkata Police.

== Demographics ==
=== Population ===
Historical population
Year	Pop.	±%
1901	1,009,853	—
1911	1,117,966	+10.7%
1921	1,158,497	+3.6%
1931	1,289,461	+11.3%
1941	2,352,399	+82.4%
1951	2,956,475	+25.7%
1961	3,351,250	+13.4%
1971	3,727,020	+11.2%
1981	4,126,846	+10.7%
1991	4,399,819	+6.6%
2001	4,572,876	+3.9%
2011	4,496,694	−1.7%
Source: Census of India

According to the 2011 census Kolkata district has a population of 4,496,694, roughly equal to the nation of Croatia or the US state of Louisiana. This gives it a ranking of 35th in India (out of a total of 640). The district has a population density of 24,252 inhabitants per square kilometre (62,810/sq mi) . Its population growth rate over the decade 2001–2011 was −1.88%. Kolkata has a sex ratio of 899 females for every 1000 males, and a literacy rate of 87.14%. Scheduled Castes and Scheduled Tribes make up 5.38% and 0.24% of the population respectively.

=== Language ===
Languages spoken in Kolkata city (2011 census)
1. Bengali (61.5%)
2. Hindi (23.0%)
3. Urdu (13.0%)
4. Oriya (0.58%)
5. Gujarati (0.57%)
6. Punjabi (0.35%)
7. English (0.20%)
8. Nepali (0.18%)
9. Tamil (0.14%)
10. Telugu (0.12%)
11. Malayalam (0.10%)
12. Others (0.44%)

Kolkata city linguistic diversity as per (2011 census)
Languages	Population
Bengali	2,763,291
Hindi	1,034,363
Urdu	586,234
Oriya	26,158
Gujarati	25,667
Punjabi	15,913
English	8,932
Nepali	8,089
Tamil	6,508
Telugu	5,330
Malayalam	4,434
Sindhi	3,724
Others	28,607
Total	4,496,694

Bengali is the most spoken language, with 61.45% of the population. Another 22.19% speak Hindi and 13.04% Urdu. Odia, Gujarati, Punjabi, Marwari and Bhojpuri are also spoken by more than 10,000 people.

The proportion of persons having Bengali as a mother tongue in Kolkata district decreased from 63.8% in 1961 to 59.9% in 1971 to 58.5% in 1981 and then increased to 63.6% in 1991, but again dropped to 62.0% in 2001 and dropped further to 61.5% in 2011. The proportion of persons having Hindi as mother tongue increased from 19.3% in 1961 to 23.2% in 1971, but then started declining to 22.2% in 1981, 20.9% in 1991 and 20.3% in 2001, but rose to 22.2% in 2011. The proportion of persons having Urdu as mother tongue has increased from 9.0% in 1961 to 13.6% in 2001 but decreased to 13.0% in 2011. The proportion of persons having English as mother tongue has dwindled from 1.0% in 1961 to 0.2% in 2001 and now only 8,900 people speak English as mother tongue, mainly Anglo-Indians.

=== Religion ===
Religion in Kolkata district (2011)
1. Hindu (76.5%)
2. Muslim (20.6%)
3. No religion (1.09%)
4. Christian (0.88%)
5. Jain (0.47%)
6. Sikh (0.31%)
7. Buddhist (0.11%)
8. Other religions (0.03%)

Religion in Kolkata district
Religion	Population (1941)	Percentage (1941)	Population (2011)	Percentage (2011)
Hinduism	1,551,512	73.57%	3,440,290	76.51%
Islam	497,535	23.59%	926,414	20.60%
Christianity	16,431	0.78%	39,758	0.88%
Others (Note: Including Jainism, Christianity, Buddhism, Zoroastrianism, Judaism, Ad-Dharmis, or not stated)	43,413	2.06%	90,232	2.01%
Total Population	2,108,891	100%	4,496,694	100%

The small minorities were Jains, who numbered 21,178 and formed 0.5% of the population. Sikhs numbered 13,849 and formed 0.3% of the population. Buddhists numbered 4,771 and formed 0.1% of the population. Persons following other religions numbered 1,452. Persons not stating religion numbered 48,982 and formed 1.1% of the population.

The proportion of Hindus in Kolkata district decreased from 83.9% in 1961 to 76.5% in 2011. During the same period Muslims increased from 12.8% to 20.6%.

== Economy ==
=== Livelihood ===
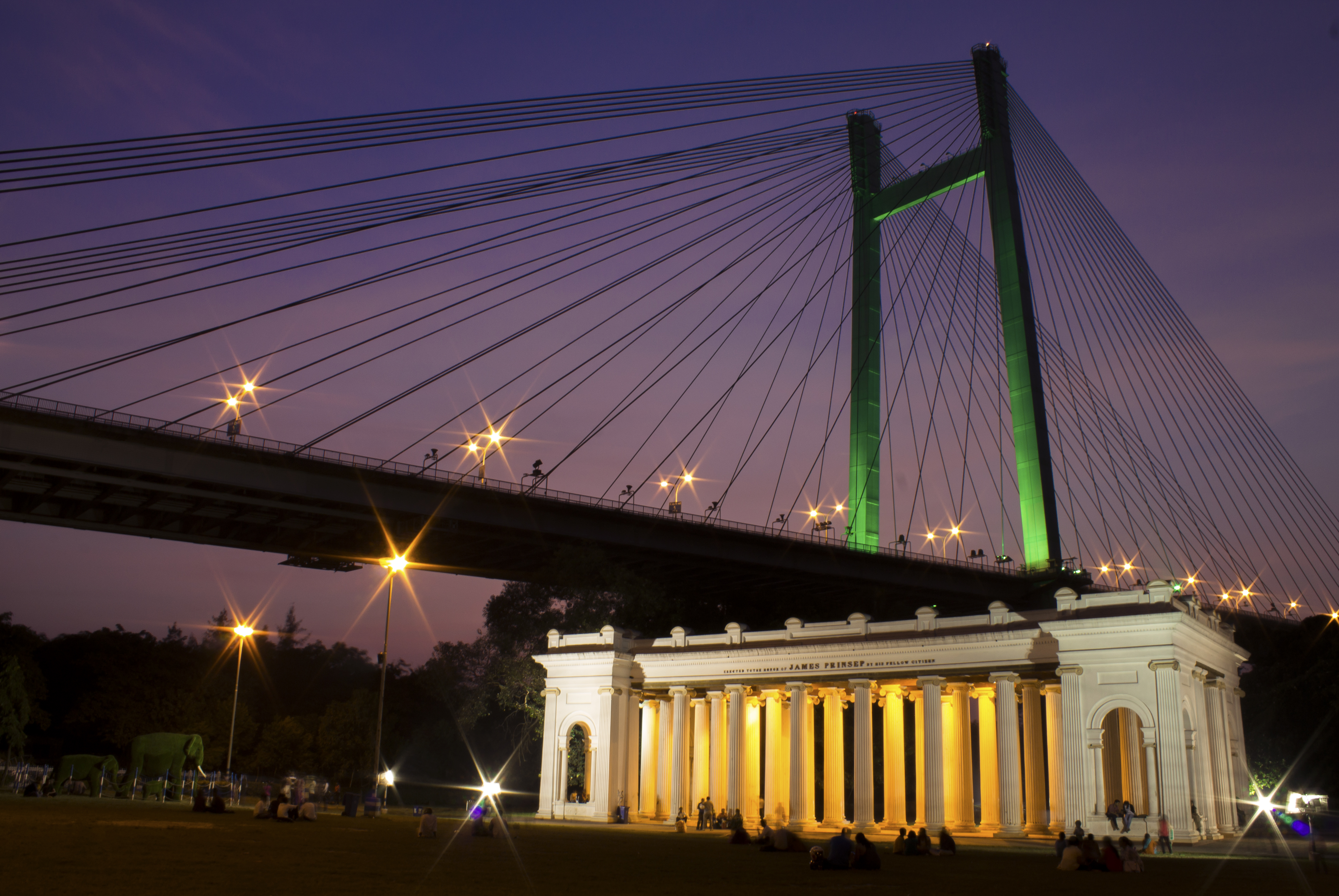
Prinsep Ghat with Vidyasagar Setu in the background

As per the 2011 census, Kolkata district has 1,795,740 total workers (main and marginal) forming 39.93% of the district population. The remaining population of 2,700,954 (60.07%) belongs to the non-workers category. While amongst the males 59.93% are total workers and 40.07% are non-workers, amongst the females 17.91% are total workers and 82.09% are non-workers.

94.61% of the total workers in urban Kolkata earn their livelihood as other workers, followed by 3.81% as household workers. Only 0.89% of total workers are engaged as cultivators and 0.69% are engaged as agricultural labourers. The type of workers that come under the category of “other workers” include all government servants, municipal employees, teachers, factory workers, plantation workers, information technology workers, those engaged in trade, commerce, business, transport, banking, mining, construction, political or social work, priests, entertainment artists, and so on.

=== Infrastructure ===
Power supply: In 1895, the Government of Bengal passed the Calcutta Electric Lighting Act and in 1897 Kilburn & Co., as agents of The Indian Electric Company Limited, secured the licence for electric lighting in Kolkata. The company soon changed its name to Calcutta Electric Supply Corporation. It commissioned the first thermal power plant in India, at Emambagh Lane, near Prinsep Street, in 1899. The switching over from horse-drawn carriages to electricity by Calcutta Tramways Company in 1902, provided further impetus to the rise in power consumption. The years of power shortage in the 1970s and 1980s, have been left behind. Now, CESC serves 2.8 million consumers. Total electric consumption in Kolkata district has gone up from 6,424 million KWH in 2006–07 to 8,135 million KWH in 2010–11.

Water supply: Newspaper reports, quoting KMC officials, say that in 2023 water demand from KMC was 360 million gallons per day and on an average, it supplied 300 mgd. 94 per cent of the city is supplied piped water, almost all of it free. The city is serviced by a 5,000 km network of pipes. As per KMC, it has 5 water treatment plants at Palta, Watgunge, Jorabagan, Dhapa and Garden Reach. There are reports that officially 15% of Kolkata's core water supply comes from ground water, in reality 25–30% of water used in households is ground water.

Roads: An estimated 6% of Kolkata's area is under roads, whereas a standard modern city demands 25–30% of the area be under roads. Pucca (surfaced) road construction started in Kolkata only after 1839, and pavements were provided along the main roads only to facilitate erection of gas lights. In 2010–11 KMC maintained 1,909 km of roads (1,670 km surfaced and 239 km unsurfaced). In 2020, the number of registered motor vehicles (including two and three wheelers) on the roads of Kolkata was 1024,000.

Drainage: Kolkata district was traditionally drained by two channels and various minor water ways. Human efforts tried to supplement the natural system. William Tolly tried to develop an eastward drainage-cum-communication channel by excavating the almost dead bed of the Adi Ganga. The 27 km long Tolly's Nullah was completed in 1777. The Lake Channel was cut through the Salt Lake later on. Some of the other channels were; Beliaghata Canal (1800), Circular Canal from Entally to Hooghly river (1820), Bhangor Khal (1897–98) and the 16 km long Krishnapur Khal, a navigational channel connecting Kolkata with Nona-Gang-Kulti Gang in South 24 Parganas (1910). Since 1742 the Bidyadhari served as an outlet for the drainage of the city, but with deterioration of the Jamuna, Bidyadhari lost much of its fresh water flow. Dr. Birendranath Dey renovated and revived the Bidyadhari in 1943. Kolkata was pioneer in introducing the underground drainage system in 1878. There are 88 km of man-entry big sewers and 92 km of non-man entry brick sewers.

Eco system: Kolkata is a highly polluted district. According to an Institute of Ecological Exploration Report, in 1984, there are only 21 trees per km in Kolkata, far below the standard mark of 100 trees per km. The per capita open space at 20 feet^{2} is too low. With these handicaps, the smoke from vehicles and industrial units, coupled with winter fogs, create a polluted environment. Noise pollution levels are also high. The noise tolerance level of average human beings is 60–65 decibels. The noise pollution levels in some areas are as follows: Binay–Badal–Dinesh Bag 80 – 85 dB, Esplanade 70 – 84 dB, Park Street 78 – 81 dB, Gariahat 80 – 82 dB and Shyambazar 80 – 82 dB. Spread over 12,500 hectares the East Kolkata Wetlands play a very vital role in maintaining the ecological balance in the neighbourhood of Kolkata. KMC dumps 2,600 tons of solid waste daily. In addition liquid sewage, toxic effluents and polluted air are recycled into clean air, fresh water, organic nutrients and a daily supply of fresh fish and green vegetables for Kolkata kitchens. The surrounding countryside continues its subsistence living with the help of this eco-system.

=== Industry ===
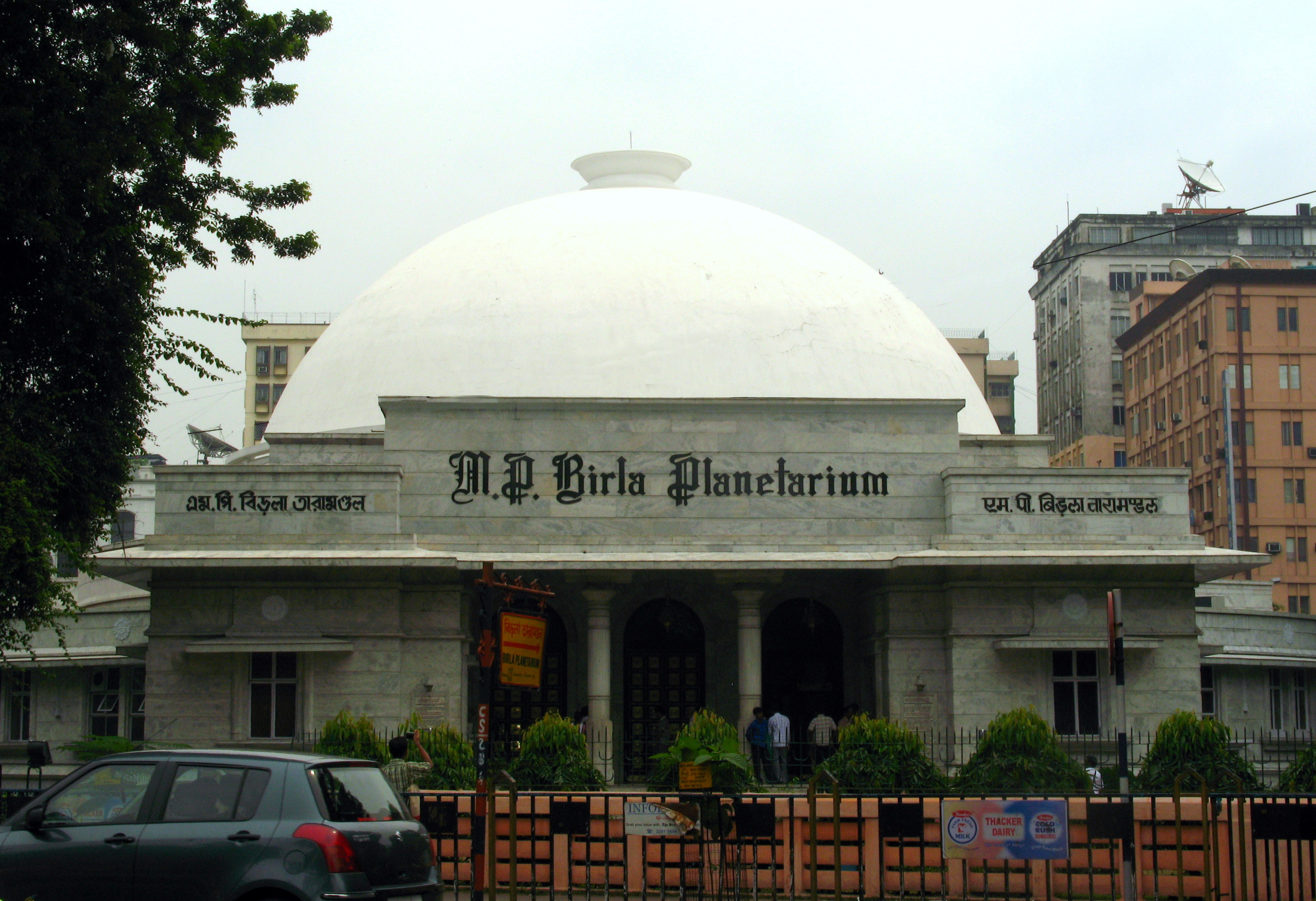
M. P. Birla Planetarium

The East India Company secured the licence for trading in Bengal from the Mughal emperor Aurangzeb. In the absence of road and air transport, in those days, water transport flourished and a port was established at Kolkata. The first telegraph line was installed as early as 1839. A pioneering pharmaceutical company, Bengal Chemical & Pharmaceutical Works was established in 1893. The film industry, based in Tollygunge, also had an early start. The first silent Bengali feature film, Bilwamangal, was produced in 1919 and the first Bengali talkie, Jamai Shashthi, was released in 1931. There were other sectors which had an early start and were subsequently followed up. Kolkata district had 1,012 registered factories in 2010. The three most important goods manufactured in Kolkata district in 2009 were: engineering goods, leather products and rubber products. There was a boom in information technology sector since 2001 with more and more companies being set up in Salt Lake Sector V and later in New Town.

Trade and Commerce: While there were only a handful of Marwaris in Kolkata's trade and commerce towards the end of the 18th century, they came in larger numbers with the turn of the century and particularly after opening of the railways (1860) and dominated Kolkata's economy. During the 1830s some of the best-known Marwari families, well established in business, were the Singhanias, the Sarafs, the Kotharis and the Bagris. By the turn of the century more Marwari families were in the business limelight: the Poddars, the Mundhras, the Dalmias, the Dugars, the Jalans, the Jhunjhunwalas, the Jaipurias, the Rampurias and the Birlas.Burrabazar became a stronghold of Marwari businessmen from the middle of the 19th century but their operations remained subservient to British business interests. Business opportunities during World War I transformed the Marwaris from a trading community to entrepreneurs and they started challenging the British economically. They gained entry into British economic strongholds like the jute and cotton industries. After World War II, as the British left India, the Marwaris acquired most of their business interests. With political ‘delinquency’ prevailing in Kolkata from the sixties many Marwaris, particularly the elite, started looking for greener pastures elsewhere. The Marwaris “could not stop incorrigible Calcutta from getting poorer; Calcutta, in turn, could not stop them from getting richer.”

== Electoral constituencies ==
Lok Sabha (parliamentary) and Vidhan Sabha (state assembly) constituencies covering Kolkata district are as follows:

Lok Sabha constituency	Reservation	Vidhan Sabha constituency	MLA	Party	Reservation	Grouped with district	KMC wards
Kolkata Uttar	None	Chowrangee	Nayna Bandyopadhyay	All India Trinamool Congress	None	Kolkata	44, 45, 46, 47, 48, 49, 50, 51, 52, 53 and 62
Kolkata Uttar	None	Entally	Sandipan Saha	All India Trinamool Congress	None	Kolkata	54, 55, 56, 58 and 59
Kolkata Uttar	None	Beleghata	Kunal Ghosh	All India Trinamool Congress	None	Kolkata	28, 29, 30, 33, 34, 35, 36 and 57
Kolkata Uttar	None	Jorasanko	Vijay Ojha	Bharatiya Janata Party	None	Kolkata	22, 23, 25, 27, 37, 38, 39, 40, 41, 42 and 43
Kolkata Uttar	None	Shyampukur	Purnima Chakraborty	Bharatiya Janata Party	None	Kolkata	7, 8, 9, 10, 17, 18, 19, 20, 21, 24 and 26
Kolkata Uttar	None	Maniktala	Tapas Roy	Bharatiya Janata Party	None	Kolkata	11, 12, 13, 14, 15, 16, 31 and 32
Kolkata Uttar	None	Kashipur-Belgachhia	Ritesh Tiwari	Bharatiya Janata Party	None	Kolkata	1, 2, 3, 4, 5 and 6
Kolkata Dakshin	None	Kolkata Port	Firhad Hakim	All India Trinamool Congress	None	Kolkata	75, 76, 78, 79, 80, 133, 134 and 135
Kolkata Dakshin	None	Bhabanipur	Suvendu Adhikari	Bharatiya Janata Party	None	Kolkata	63, 70, 71, 72, 73, 74, 77 and 82
Kolkata Dakshin	None	Rashbehari	Swapan Dasgupta	Bharatiya Janata Party	None	Kolkata	81, 83, 84, 86, 87, 88, 89, 90 and 93
Kolkata Dakshin	None	Ballygunge	Sovandeb Chattopadhyay	All India Trinamool Congress	None	Kolkata	60, 61, 64, 65, 68, 69 and 85

== Reorganisation ==
On June 22, 2026, in the budget session of the West Bengal Legislative Assembly for the financial year 2026–27, Swapan Dasgupta, the new Finance Minister of the West Bengal Government, announced a proposal to form 5 new districts, including Kolkata, in the state. According to the proposal, Kolkata will be reorganized into a full-fledged district and the entire area of the Kolkata Municipal Corporation will be included in the new Kolkata district. In addition, some municipal areas adjacent to Kolkata city such as Rajpur Sonarpur, Maheshtala and Bidhannagar are also being considered for inclusion in the proposed district.

== See also ==
- Chennai district
- Delhi
- Kolkata metropolitan region
- List of districts of West Bengal
- Mumbai City district
