= Kolkata Uttar Lok Sabha constituency =

Lok Sabha constituency in West Bengal

Coordinates: 22°34′22″N 88°21′50″E

Kolkata Uttar WB-24
- Lok Sabha constituency
- Interactive Map Outlining Kolkata Uttar Lok Sabha Constituency

Constituency details
- Country: India
- Region: East India
- State: West Bengal
- Assembly constituencies: Chowrangee; Entally; Beleghata; Jorasanko; Shyampukur; Maniktala; Kashipur-Belgachhia
- Established: 2009–Present
- Total electors: 1,505,356
- Reservation: None

Member of Parliament
- 18th Lok Sabha
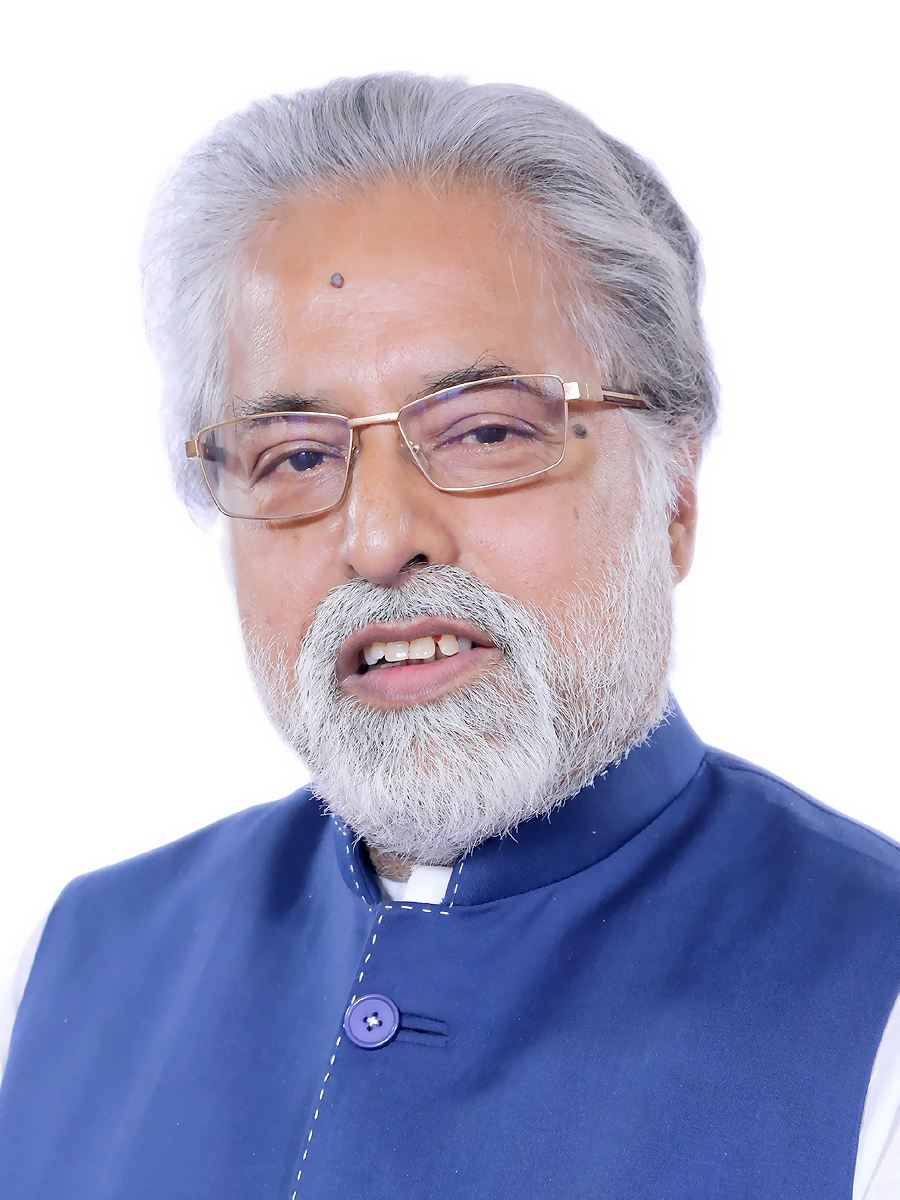
- Incumbent Sudip Bandyopadhyay
- Party: NCPI
- Alliance: NDA
- Elected year: 2024

Kolkata Uttar Lok Sabha constituency is one of the 543 parliamentary constituencies in India. The constituency is based on the northern parts of Kolkata in West Bengal. All the seven assembly segments of No. 24 Kolkata Uttar Lok Sabha constituency are in Kolkata district.

== Assembly segments ==
Parliamentary constituencies in West Bengal - 1. Cooch Behar, 2. Alipurduars, 3. Jalpaiguri, 4. Darjeeling, 5. Raiganj, 6. Balurghat, 7. Maldaha Uttar, 8. Maldaha Dakshin, 9. Jangipur, 10. Baharampur, 11. Murshidabad, 12. Krishnanagar, 13. Ranaghat, 14. Bangaon, 15. Barrackpore, 16. Dum Dum, 17. Barasat, 18. Basirhat, 19. Jaynagar, 20. Mathurapur, 21. Diamond Harbour, 22. Jadavpur, 23. Kolkata Dakshin, 24. Kolkata Uttar, 25. Howrah, 26. Uluberia, 27. Serampore, 28. Hoghly, 29. Arambagh, 30. Tamluk, 31, Kanthi, 32. Ghatal, 33. Jhargram, 34. Medinipur, 35. Purulia, 36. Bankura, 37. Bishnupur, 38. Bardhaman Purba, 39. Bardhaman Durgapur, 40. Asansol, 41. Bolpur, 42. Birbhum

As per order of the Delimitation Commission in respect of the Delimitation of constituencies in the West Bengal, Kolkata Uttar Lok Sabha constituency is composed of the following legislative assembly segments from 2009:

#	Name	District	MLA, from 2026	Party	2024 Lok Sabha Lead
162	Chowrangee	Kolkata	Nayna Bandyopadhyay	AITC	AITC
163	Entally	Kolkata	Sandipan Saha	AITC	AITC
164	Beleghata	Kolkata	Kunal Ghosh	AITC	AITC
165	Jorasanko	Kolkata	Vijay Ojha	BJP	BJP
166	Shyampukur	Kolkata	Purnima Chakraborty	BJP	BJP
167	Maniktala	Kolkata	Tapas Roy	BJP	AITC
168	Kashipur-Belgachhia	Kolkata	Ritesh Tiwari	BJP	AITC

== Members of Parliament ==
Year	Member	Party
2009	Sudip Bandyopadhyay	Trinamool Congress
2014	Sudip Bandyopadhyay	Trinamool Congress
2019	Sudip Bandyopadhyay	Trinamool Congress
2024	Sudip Bandyopadhyay	Trinamool Congress
2026 (Note: Switched to NCPI as part of AITC Rebels in Lok Sabha.)	Sudip Bandyopadhyay	Nationalist Citizens Party of India

For MPs from northern parts of Kolkata in previous years see Calcutta North East Lok Sabha constituency and Calcutta North West Lok Sabha constituency

== Election results ==
=== General election 2024 ===
2024 Indian general election: Kolkata Uttar
Party	Candidate	Votes	%	±%
AITC	Sudip Bandyopadhyay	454,696	47.44	▼2.52
BJP	Tapas Roy	362,136	37.78	▲1.19
INC	Pradip Bhattacharya	114,982	12.00	▲9.26
NOTA	None of the above	10,044	1.05	▲0.34
Majority		92,560	9.62	
Turnout		958,433	63.67	
AITC hold		Swing		

=== General election 2019 ===
2019 Indian general elections: Kolkata Uttar
Party	Candidate	Votes	%	±%
AITC	Sudip Bandyopadhyay	474,891	49.96	+14.02
BJP	Rahul Sinha	3,47,796	36.59	+10.71
CPI(M)	Kaninika Bose Ghosh	71,080	7.48	−13.02
INC	Syed Shahid Imam	26,093	2.74	−10.94
NOTA	None of the above	6,736	0.71	+0.71
Majority		127,095	13.36	
Turnout		950,639	65.83	
AITC hold		Swing		

=== General election 2014 ===
2014 Indian general elections: Kolkata Uttar
Party	Candidate	Votes	%	±%
AITC	Sudip Bandyopadhyay	343,687	35.94	−16.96
BJP	Rahul Sinha	2,47,461	25.88	+21.66
CPI(M)	Rupa Bagchi	1,96,549	20.50	−19.55
INC	Somendra Nath Mitra	1,30,783	13.68	+13.68
NOTA	None of the above	9,103	0.95	New
Majority		96,226	10.06	−2.41
Turnout		9,55,778	66.65	−18.80
AITC hold		Swing		

=== General election 2009 ===
2009 Indian general elections: Kolkata Uttar
Party	Candidate	Votes	%	±%
AITC	Sudip Bandyopadhyay	460,646	52.50	
CPI(M)	Mohammed Salim	3,51,368	40.05	
BJP	Tathagata Roy	37,044	4.22	
IND	Sultan Osman	9,155	1.04	
BSP	Sharad Kumar Singh	5,666	0.65	
Majority		1,09,278	12.45	
Turnout		8,77,381	64.20	
AITC win (new seat)				

2009 Indian general election West Bengal summary
Party	Seats won	Seat change	Vote percentage
Trinamool Congress	19	▲18	31.8
Indian National Congress	6	▲0	13.45
Socialist Unity Centre of India (Communist)	1	▲1	NA
Communist Party of India (Marxist)	9	▼17	33.1
Communist Party of India	2	▼1	3.6
Revolutionary Socialist Party	2	▼1	3.56
Forward bloc	2	▼1	3.04
Bharatiya Janata Party	1	▲1	6.14

== See also ==
- Kolkata
- List of constituencies of the Lok Sabha
