= Abul Hassan (West Bengal politician) =

Abul Hassan (born 1917) was an Indian politician and trade unionist, belonging to the Communist Party of India (Marxist). He was a member of the West Bengal Legislative Assembly from 1969 to 1970 and from 1977 to 1982.

== Biography ==
Abul Hassan was born on April 10, 1917, in the United Provinces of Agra and Oudh, the son of Tajammul Hossain. He joined politics in 1931 and became a member of the Communist Party of India in 1942. He became the vice president of the Bengal Chatkal Mazdoor Union in 1959.

During the 1964 split in the Communist Party of India, Abul Hassan sided with the Communist Party of India (Marxist). In 1967, he became the working president of the Hindusthan Motor Workers Union and vice president of the Metal Engineering Federation Workers Union. Abul Hassan contested the Taltola seat in the 1967 West Bengal Legislative Assembly election. He finished in second place with 12,041 votes (33.72%).

He would again contest the Taltola seat in the 1969 West Bengal Legislative Assembly election, this time winning the seat and obtaining 22,506 votes (59.90%). In 1970, he became a member of the General Council of the Centre of Indian Trade Unions (CITU) and the president of both the Kesoram Rayon Workers' Union and the Employees' Union. He was also a member of the CITU West Bengal State Committee.

Abul Hassan lost the Taltola seat in the 1971 West Bengal Legislative Assembly election, finishing in second place with 13,217 votes (44.28%). He tried to regain the Taltola seat in the 1972 West Bengal Legislative Assembly election, obtaining 17,355 votes (45.41%) and again finishing in second place.

Ahead of the 1977 West Bengal Legislative Assembly election, the CPI(M) fielded Abul Hassan as its candidate for the Bow Bazar seat. He won the seat, obtaining 13,996 votes (38.54%). Abul Hassan lost the Bow Bazar seat in the 1982 West Bengal Legislative Assembly election, finishing in second place with 22,615 votes (44.67%).
