= Sudhangshu Seal =

Indian politician (1945–2026)

Member of Parliament, Lok Sabha
- In office 2004–2009
- Preceded by: Sudip Bandyopadhyay
- Succeeded by: Constituency abolished
- Constituency: Calcutta North West

MLA
- In office 2001–2004
- Preceded by: Sanjoy Bakshi
- Succeeded by: Parimal Biswas
- Constituency: Jorabagan

Councillor of Kolkata Municipal Corporation
- In office 1990–2005, 2010 – 2015
- Constituency: Ward No. 20

Personal details
- Born: 27 March 1945 Calcutta, Bengal Province, British India
- Died: 14 May 2026 (aged 81) Kolkata, West Bengal, India
- Party: CPI(M)
- Spouse: Shibani Seal
- Children: 1 son and 1 daughter
- As of 17 September, 2006

Sudhangshu Seal (or Shudhangshu Shil; 27 March 1945 – 14 May 2026) was an Indian politician who was a member of the 14th Lok Sabha. He represented the Kolkata North West constituency of West Bengal and is a member of the Communist Party of India (Marxist) (CPI(M)) political party.

Seal was a four time Councillor and Mayor-In-Council for Roads Department from Ward No. 20 of Kolkata Municipal Corporation from 1990 to 2005 and re-elected again in KMC Election 2010. In the K.M.C election 2010, he was chosen as the Left Front's mayoral candidate. After the Left Front lost the election to the Trinamool Congress, the CPI(M) leadership denied him the post of the Leader of the Opposition and former CPI(M) MLA and councillor Rupa Bagchi took office as the leader of the opposition.

Seal died at a private hospital in Kolkata, on 14 May 2026, at the age of 81.
