= Swarna Kamal Saha =

Indian politician

Member of West Bengal Legislative Assembly
- In office 13 May 2011 – 7 May 2026
- Preceded by: Hashim Abdul Halim
- Succeeded by: Sandipan Saha
- Constituency: Entally

Member of West Bengal Legislative Assembly
- In office 28 August 2009 – 13 May 2011
- Preceded by: Sudip Bandyopadhyay
- Succeeded by: Constituency abolished
- Constituency: Bowbazar

Personal details
- Born: 5 November 1948 (age 77)
- Party: Trinamool Congress
- Children: Sandipan Saha (son)
- Profession: Politician

Swarna Kamal Saha is an Indian politician & member of Trinamool Congress. He is a former MLA, elected from the Entally constituency in the 2011 West Bengal state assembly election. In 2016 and 2021 assembly election he was re-elected from the same constituency.
