= Sukumar Sen =

Sukumar Sen may refer to:

- Sukumar Sen (civil servant) (1899–1963), India's first Chief Election Commissioner
- Sukumar Sen (linguist) (1900–1992), Bengali linguist and author
