= Calcutta North West Lok Sabha constituency =

Former Constituency of the Indian parliament in West Bengal

Coordinates: 22°34′22″N 88°21′50″E

Calcutta North West
- Former Lok Sabha constituency

Constituency details
- Country: India
- Region: East India
- State: West Bengal
- Assembly constituencies: (in 2004): Cossipur; Shyampukur; Jorabagan; Jorasanko; Bara Bazar; Bowbazar; Taltola (SC)
- Established: 1951
- Abolished: 2009
- Reservation: None

Calcutta North West Lok Sabha constituency was one of the 543 parliamentary constituencies in India. The constituency centred on the north-western part of Calcutta in West Bengal. As a consequence of the order of the Delimitation Commission in respect of the delimitation of constituencies in the West Bengal, this parliamentary constituency ceased to exist from 2009.

== Assembly segments ==
In 2004, Calcutta North West Lok Sabha constituency was composed of the following assembly segments:

- Cossipur (assembly constituency no. 140)
- Shyampukur (assembly constituency no. 141)
- Jorabagan (assembly constituency no. 142)
- Jorasanko (assembly constituency no. 143)
- Bara Bazar (assembly constituency no. 144)
- Bowbazar (assembly constituency no. 145)
- Taltola (SC) (assembly constituency no. 154)

== Members of Parliament ==
Duration	Name of M.P.	Party affiliation
1952	Meghnad Saha	Revolutionary Socialist Party
1957	Ashoke Kumar Sen	Indian National Congress
1962	Ashoke Kumar Sen	Indian National Congress
1967	Ashoke Kumar Sen	Indian National Congress
1971	Ashoke Kumar Sen	Indian National Congress
1977	Bijoy Singh Nahar	Janata Party
1980	Ashoke Kumar Sen	Indian National Congress
1984	Ashoke Kumar Sen	Indian National Congress
1989	Debi Prasad Pal	Indian National Congress
1991	Debi Prasad Pal	Indian National Congress
1996	Debi Prasad Pal	Indian National Congress
1998	Sudip Bandyopadhyay	Trinamool Congress
1999	Sudip Bandyopadhyay	Trinamool Congress
2004	Sudhangshu Seal	Communist Party of India (Marxist)

For MPs from northern parts of Kolkata in subsequent years see Kolkata Uttar Lok Sabha constituency

== Election results ==
=== General election 2004 ===
2004 Indian general election: Calcutta North West
Party	Candidate	Votes	%	±%
CPI(M)	Sudhangshu Seal	182,772	42.20	
AITC	Subrata Mukherjee	139,768	30.20	
INC	Sudip Bandyopadhyay	111,952	22.80	
Independent	Sudip Bandyopadhyay	3,450		
Independent	Prof. Vijay Kumar Arora	2,666		
Independent	Sudhir kr. Bishram	2,201		
Independent	Ashim Das	2,172		
BSP	Rizwan Ahmad Siddiqui	2,127		
Independent	Subrata Banerjee	1,185		
Independent	Biplab Mukherjee	1,079		
Independent	Ramendra Pandey	969		
Independent	Gopal Chandra Saha	697		
Independent	Lok Nath Saraff	640		
Independent	Kamalesh Ojha	439		
Margin of victory		43,004	12.00%	
Turnout		360,117		
CPI(M) gain from Trinamool Congress		Swing		

=== General election 1999 ===
1999 Indian general election: Calcutta North West
Party	Candidate	Votes	%	±%
AITC	Sudip Bandyopadhyay	206,684	46.60	
CPI(M)	Rajdeo Goala	112,514	25.37	
INC	Siddhartha Shankar Ray	106,430	24.00	
Independent	Sasanka Saha	3,888	0.88	
JD(S)	Masarrat Begum	3,076	0.69	
RJD	Asiruddin	2,602	0.59	
Independent	Purna Chandra Ghosh	1,914	0.43	
BSP	Narayan Saha	1,857	0.42	
Independent	Pradyut Saha	1,173	0.26	
Independent	Indranil Kumar	1,141	0.26	
JP	Parimal Biswas	1,017	0.23	
Independent	Imtiaz Alam (Fahim)	626	0.14	
Independent	Bihari Lal Thalia	564	0.13	
Margin of victory		94,170		
Turnout		4,62,269	67.47	
AITC hold		Swing		

=== General election 1998 ===
1998 Indian general election: Calcutta North West
Party	Candidate	Votes	%	±%
Trinamool Congress	Sudip Bandyopadhyay	226,832	49.07	
CPI(M)	Sarla Maheshwari	153,349	33.17	
INC	Dr. Debi Prasad Pal	75,047	16.23	
SS	Kana Ram	1,421	0.31	
JD(S)	Ramen Pandey	1,393	0.30	
RJD	Abdul Samad Sardar	845	0.18	
Independent	Ashoke Dutta	777	0.17	
BSP	Gholam Mohammed	698	0.15	
Independent	Narayan Saha	597	0.13	
Independent	Ashok Pandey	480	0.10	
JP	Bihari Lal Thalia	3,23	0.07	
Independent	Sultan Ahmed Tarafdar	206	0.04	
Independent	Amar Nath Sen	153	0.03	
Independent	Indranil Kumar	148	0.03	
Margin of victory		73,483		
Turnout		4,43,486	63.07	
Trinamool Congress gain from INC		Swing		

=== General election 1996 ===
1996 Indian general election: Calcutta North West
Party	Candidate	Votes	%	±%
INC	Dr. Debi Prasad Pal	212,637	48.07%	
JD	Shyamal Bhattacharjee	147,686	33.17%	
BJP	Amal Dutta	59,395	16.23%	
Independent	Himadri Bhusan Kali	1,421	0.31%	
Independent	Ramen Pandey	1,393	0.30%	
RJD	Abdul Samad Sardar	845	0.18%	
Independent	Ashoke Dutta	777	0.17%	
BSP	Gholam Mohammed	698	0.15%	
Independent	Narayan Saha	597	0.13%	
Independent	Ashok Pandey	480	0.10%	
JP	Bihari Lal Thalia	3,23	0.07%	
Independent	Sultan Ahmed Tarafdar	206	0.04%	
Independent	Amar Nath Sen	153	0.03%	
Independent	Indranil Kumar	148	0.03%	
Margin of victory		64,951		
Turnout		4,43,486	63.07	
INC hold		Swing		

=== General election 1991 ===
1991 Indian general election: Calcutta North West
Party	Candidate	Votes	%	±%
INC	Dr. Debi Prasad Pal	166,227	40.06%	
JD	Dilip Chakravartty	134,408	32.08%	
BJP	Victor Banerjee	89,155	21.08%	
Jharkhand Party	Singh Bimla	2,190	0.50%	
Independent	Lok Nath Saraf	1,523	0.40%	
Independent	Ram Beharilal Thlia	999	0.20%	
LKD	Lok Nath Choudhury	621	0.20%	
BSP	Hari Naraiyan Ray	607	0.10%	
Akhil Bharatiya Jan Sangh	Agarwal Durga Dutt	596	0.10%	
Doordarshi Party	Chhedi Lal Jalan	574	0.10%	
JP	Naraiyan Ch. Roy	539	0.10%	
Independent	Shyam Sunder Bhiwaniwala	527	0.10%	
Independent	Bimal Sengupta	497	0.10%	
Independent	Dayasankar Tewari	480	0.10%	
Independent	Asis Kumar Nandi	383	0.10%	
Independent	Biswa Nath Das	280	0.10%	
Independent	Roy Ranjit Kumar	272	0.10%	
Independent	Bimal Kumar Bilotia	241	0.10%	
Independent	Lakshmi Naraiyan Mamani	216	0.10%	
Independent	Balswar Singh	207	0.10%	
Independent	Ravindra Kumar Jain	203	0.00%	
Independent	Ramendra Pandey	167	0.00%	
Independent	Pathak Raj Naraiyan	144	0.00%	
Independent	Laxmi Naraiyan Ojha	116	0.00%	
Independent	Sita Ram Goenka	116	0.00%	
Independent	Kapil Muni Pande	105	0.00%	
Independent	Tapan Kumar Seal	100	0.00%	
Independent	Durga Prasad	91	0.00%	
Margin of victory		31,819	7.8%	
Turnout		4,09,564	58.01%	
		Swing		

=== General election 1989 ===
1989 Indian general election: Calcutta North West
Party	Candidate	Votes	%	±%
INC	Dr. Debi Prasad Pal	219,586	40.06%	
JD	Ashoke Kumar Sen	164,854	32.08%	
BJP	Shanti Lal Jain	31,677	21.08%	
ABJS	Shibji Prasad Gupta	2,894	0.50%	
Independent	Durga Dutt Agarwal	1,527	0.40%	
Independent	Lok Nath Saraf	1,116	0.20%	
Independent	Bimal Kumar Bhilotia	652	0.20%	
Independent	Benoy Sircar	602	0.10%	
Akhil Bharatiya Jan Sangh	Ram Beharilal Bilotia	597	0.10%	
Independent	Ambar Chatterjee	602	0.10%	
JP	Md. Ayub	536	0.10%	
Independent	Gopal Taparia	516	0.10%	
Independent	Basant Singh	484	0.10%	
Independent	Sambhu Singh	409	0.10%	
Independent	Debabrata Ghosh	373	0.10%	
Independent	Prakash Chandra Saxena	331	0.10%	
Independent	Lakshmi Narayan Mimani	294	0.10%	
Independent	Md. Maniruddin	253	0.10%	
Independent	Md. Yousuf	229	0.10%	
Independent	Rajkumar Jain	219	0.10%	
Independent	Baleswar Singh	206	0.00%	
Independent	Rajnarayan Pathak	187	0.00%	
Independent	Shankar Lal Bajoria	173	0.00%	
Independent	Ramendra Pandey	165	0.00%	
Independent	Md. Yasin Mallick	156	0.00%	
Independent	Mahabir Prasad Bajaj	97	0.00%	
Independent	Tonny Malhotra	96	0.00%	
Independent	Durga Prasad	91	0.00%	
Margin of victory		64,732	7.8%	
Turnout		4,31,007	63.32%	
		Swing		

=== General election 1984 ===
1984 Indian general election: Calcutta North West
Party	Candidate	Votes	%	±%
INC	Ashoke Kumar Sen	242,982	64.24%	
AIFB	Amiya Nath Bose	110,560	32.08%	
BJP	Durga Prasad Nathany	10,781	21.08%	
Independent	Ibrahim Khan	5,611	0.50%	
Independent	Benoy Sircar	1,982	0.40%	
ABJS	Durga Dutta Agarwal	1,233	0.20%	
Independent	Arun Biswas	1,222	0.20%	
Independent	Babban Singh	1,189	0.10%	
Independent	Benoy Sircar	602	0.10%	
Independent	Ram Beharilal Thelia	905	0.10%	
Independent	Ashok Jain Chabbra	821	0.10%	
Independent	Ram Chabila Shahi	496	0.10%	
Independent	Gopal Taparia	439	0.10%	
Margin of victory		1,32,422	7.8%	
Turnout		3,78,221	64.73%	
INC hold		Swing		

=== General election 1980 ===
1980 Indian general election: Calcutta North West
Party	Candidate	Votes	%	±%
INC	Ashoke Kumar Sen	150,476	47.90%	
AIFB	Shyam Sundar Gupta	106,643	33.94%	
JP	Bijoy Singh Nahar	44,611	14.20%	
JP(S)	Ranjit Kumar Mitra	3,542	1.13%	
Independent	Ganadeb Mullick	2,146	0.68%	
ABJS	Durga Dutta Agarwal	1,322	0.42%	
Independent	Mohan Lal Soni	1,041	0.33%	
Independent	Bishnu Kant Thakur	708	0.23%	
Independent	S.C.Roy	612	0.19%	
BSP	Shew Prasad Gupta	576	0.18%	
Independent	Upendranath Halder	500	0.16%	
Independent	Ramendra Bhushan Singh	484	0.15%	
Independent	Bikram Singh Chandallia	474	0.15%	
Independent	Pratap Narayan Tiwari	421	0.13%	
Independent	Milan Chand Choraria	324	0.10%	
Independent	Karuna Nidhan Roy	288	0.09%	
Margin of victory		43,733		
Turnout		3,14,168	51.89%	
INC gain from BLD		Swing		

=== General election 1977 ===
1977 Indian general election: Calcutta North West
Party	Candidate	Votes	%	±%
JP	Bijoy Singh Nahar	179,681	47.90%	
INC	Ashoke Kumar Sen	110,048	32.08%	
Independent	Upendra Nath Halder	19,839	21.08%	
Independent	Shankar Lal Bajoria	1,402	0.50%	
Independent	Fazal Ahmed	754	0.40%	
Independent	Loknath Saraf	737	0.40%	
Independent	Sujit Chakraborty	724	0.40%	
Independent	Basanta Singh	695	0.40%	
Margin of victory		69,633		
Turnout		3,13,880	54.00%	
Swing to JP from INC		Swing		

=== General election 1971 ===
1971 Indian general election: Calcutta North West
Party	Candidate	Votes	%	±%
INC	Ashoke Kumar Sen	144,055	47.90%	
CPI(M)	Prasanta Kumar Sur	70,776	32.08%	
Independent	Haripada Bharati	34,397	21.08%	
Independent	Bindu Prasad Gupta	2,316	0.50%	
Margin of victory		73,279		
Turnout		2,51,544	40.96%	
INC hold		Swing		

=== General election 1967 ===
1967 Indian general election: Calcutta North West
Party	Candidate	Votes	%	±%
INC	Ashoke Kumar Sen	154,664	47.90%	
Independent	S.P Roy	89.838	32.08%	
ABJS	Haripada Bharati	82,455	21.08%	
Independent	P.Dey	4,124	0.50%	
Independent	K.Chandiprasad	3,863	0.50%	
Independent	P.Dey	3,796	0.50%	
Margin of victory		64,826		
Turnout		3,38,740	58.70%	
INC hold		Swing		

=== General election 1962 ===
1962 Indian general election: Calcutta North West
Party	Candidate	Votes	%	±%
INC	Ashoke Kumar Sen	143,725	47.90%	
CPI	Snehansu Kanta Acharya	110,347	32.08%	
ABJS	Chandi Prasad Kedia	5,913	21.08%	
Independent	Dinesh Das Gupta	3,554	0.50%	
Margin of victory		43,378		
Turnout		2,63,539	64.58%	
INC hold		Swing		

=== General election 1957 ===
1957 Indian general election: Calcutta North West
Party	Candidate	Votes	%	±%
INC	Ashoke Kumar Sen	102,807	47.90%	
Independent	Mohit Moitra	96,880	32.08%	
ABJS	Sanjib Kumar Chowdhury	6,307	21.08%	
Margin of victory		5,927		
Turnout		2,05,994	49.73%	
INC gain from RSP		Swing		

=== General election 1952 ===
1952 Indian general election: Calcutta North West
Party	Candidate	Votes	%	±%
RSP	Dr. Meghnad Saha	74,124	47.90%	
INC	Prabhau Dayal Himatsingka	51,168	32.08%	
Independent	Bhanwarmal Singhi	4,686	21.08%	
Independent	Nalini Rajnan Sengupta	4,595	21.08%	
Independent	Mohit Kumar Moitra	1,998	21.08%	
Independent	Karuna Mitra	1,383	21.08%	
Independent	Butto Kumar Roy	1,018	21.08%	
Independent	Panchu Gopal Sen	759	21.08%	
Margin of victory		22,956		
Turnout		1,39,731	36.52%	
RSP win (new seat)				

=== General elections 1951-2004 ===
Most of the contests were multi-cornered. However, only winners and runners-up are mentioned below:

Year	Voters	Voter turnout	Winner			Runners up		
		%age	Candidate	%age	Party	Candidate	%age	Party
1951	139,731	36.52	Meghnad Saha	53.05	RSP	Prabhu Dayal Himatsingka	36.62	Congress
1957	205,994	49.73	Ashoke Kumar Sen	49.91	Congress	Mohit Maitra	47.03	Independent
1962	268,078	64.58	Ashoke Kumar Sen	54.54	Congress	Snehansu Kanta Acharyya	41.87	CPI
1967	347,334	58.70	Ashoke Kumar Sen	45.66	Congress	S.P.Roy	26.52	Independent
1972	257,684	40.96	Ashoke Kumar Sen	57.27	Congress	Prasanta Kumar Sur	28.14	CPI(M)
1977	321,740	54	Bijoy Singh Nahar	57.25	BLD	Ashoke Kumar Sen	35.06	Congress
1980	319,810	51.89	Ashoke Kumar Sen	47.9	Congress	Shyam Sundar Gupta	33.94	Forward Bloc
1984	387,150	64.73	Ashoke Kumar Sen	64.24	Congress	Amiya Nath Bose	29.23	Forward Bloc
1989	439,770	63.32	Debi Prasad Pal	50.95	Congress	Ashoke Kumar Sen	38.25	JD
1991	409,560	58.14	Debi Prasad Pal	41.39	Congress	Dilip Chakravarti	33.47	JD
1996	452,760	65.24	Debi Prasad Pal	48.31	Congress	Shyamal Bhattacharjee	33.56	JD
1998	469,380	67.47	Sudip Bandyopadhyay	49.07	Trinamool Congress	Sarala Maheswari	33.17	CPI(M)
1999	444,040	63.07	Sudip Bandopadhyay	46.6	Trinamool Congress	Rajdeo Goala	25.37	CPI(M)
2004	360,120	59.11	Sudhangsu Seal	42.15	CPI(M)	Subrata Mukherjee	30.2	Trinamool Congress

== See also ==
- Kolkata
- List of constituencies of the Lok Sabha
