= Desh (film) =

- Poster of the film
- Directed by: Raja Sen
- Written by: Animesh Rai Chaudhary & Prafulla Roy
- Starring: Jaya Bachchan; Samata Das; Sabyasachi Chakrabarty; Subhendu Chatterjee; Nayna Bandyopadhyay; Gyanesh Mukherjee; Dulal Lahiri; Kaushik Sen; George Baker; Rajesh Sharma
- Release date: 15 March 2002
- Country: India
- Language: Bengali

Desh (transl. Country) is a 2002 Bengali film directed by Raja Sen. The film is based on a story written by Prafulla Roy. It is written against the backdrop of arms trafficking in North Bengal.

== Plot ==
Suprabha Chowdhury is preparing to move to the United States to live with her son, Anjan, when a young woman named Shanti shows up and asks for shelter because she uncovered an arms trafficking ring and fears her life is in danger. Suprabha cancels her trip and stays to help Shanti.

== Cast ==
- Jaya Bachchan as Suprabha Chowdhury, formerly a freedom fighter in Indian National Movement
  - Samata Das as young Suprabha Chowdhury
- Sabyasachi Chakrabarty as Sanjay Nandi
- Subhendu Chatterjee as Pratul Haldar
- Nayna Bandyopadhyay as Shila Chatterjee
- Gyanesh Mukherjee as Ambika Singh
- Monu Mukherjee as Sudhakanta Chatterjee, Shila's father
- Dulal Lahiri as Mr. Sharma
- Kaushik Sen as Akhil Som, an Indian revolutionary
- George Baker as Douglas
- Rajesh Sharma as Pulak
- Sumit Ganguly as Bolte
- Shankar Ghosh
- Kalyani Mandal as Shanti
- Abhishek Bachchan (Cameo) as Anjan Chowdhury, the son of Suprabha Chowdhury

== Production ==
Part of the film was shot in Siliguri. While Abhishek Bachchan was in Kolkata, he made a cameo as his real life mother Jaya Bachchan's son and did not have to speak in Bengali. This film marked the first time he shared screen space with his mother.
