= Ashoke Kumar Sen =

Indian politician and lawyer

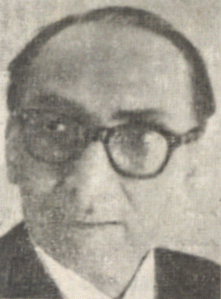
- Lok Sabha portrait

Member of Parliament, Rajya Sabha
- In office 3 April 1990 – 2 April 1996
- Constituency: West Bengal

Minister of Law and Justice
- In office 1957–1966
- Prime Minister: Jawaharlal Nehru
- Preceded by: Charu Chandra Biswas
- Succeeded by: Gopal Swarup Pathak
- In office 1984–1987
- Prime Minister: Rajiv Gandhi
- Preceded by: Jagannath Kaushal
- Succeeded by: P. Shiv Shankar

Minister of Electronics & Communications Technology
- In office 1 September 1963 – 13 June 1964
- Preceded by: Jagjivan Ram
- Succeeded by: Satya Narayan Sinha

Minister of Steel and Mines

President of Supreme Court Bar Association of India

President of Indian Football Association

Member of Parliament, Lok Sabha
- In office 1957–1977
- Preceded by: Meghnad Saha
- Succeeded by: Bijoy Singh Nahar
- Constituency: Calcutta North West
- In office 1980–1989
- Preceded by: Bijoy Singh Nahar
- Succeeded by: Debi Prasad Pal
- Constituency: Calcutta North West

Personal details
- Born: 10 October 1913 Faridpur, Bengal Presidency, British Raj
- Died: 31 August 1996 (aged 82) New Delhi, India
- Party: Indian National Congress Janata Dal, Independent
- Spouse: Anjana Sen
- Children: 2 daughters 2 sons
- Relatives: Sukumar Sen (brother); Amartya Sen (nephew)
- Education: Presidency College, Kolkata; London School of Economics
- Profession: Lawyer

Ashoke Kumar Sen (10 October 1913 – 31 August 1996) was an Indian barrister, a former Cabinet minister of India, and an Indian parliamentarian.

He also holds the record for winning a Lok Sabha seat the most times and also the record for being not only an MP for the most years, but also a cabinet minister – serving more than 7 prime ministers. For decades, he was the inevitable Union Law Minister.

== Background ==
Ashoke Kumar Sen was born in 1913 during the British Raj in a well-known Baidya family. His father was a district magistrate. Both Ashoke Kumar Sen and Sukumar Sen were students of Sambalpur high School, Odisha wherein Late Mr. Suryamani Jena of village Kusupur was the Principal. His elder brother, Sukumar Sen ICS (b. 1899), who went on to become India, Sudan and Nepal's first Chief Election Commissioner, funded his education in England, at the London School of Economics. Ashoke Sen went on to study for the Bar at Gray's Inn.

Upon his return, he started teaching law at the City College, Kolkata a constituent college of the University of Calcutta He then began practising in the Calcutta High Court. At the age of 26, he had already written a book about Commercial Law, which was endorsed by Mr. Sen's then senior Sudhi Ranjan Das, the future Chief Justice of India.

Some years later, in February 1943, Ashoke Kumar Sen married Anjana Das, his senior's only daughter. They had two sons and two daughters.

== Legal career ==
Within five years of practice, Sen became regarded as one of the top lawyers in the Calcutta High Court and gained wide acclaim. He published many books and articles, and was the Editor of Calcutta Law Journal.

Sen was a Senior Advocate of the Supreme Court, and President of the Supreme Court Bar Association several times.

== Parliamentary career ==
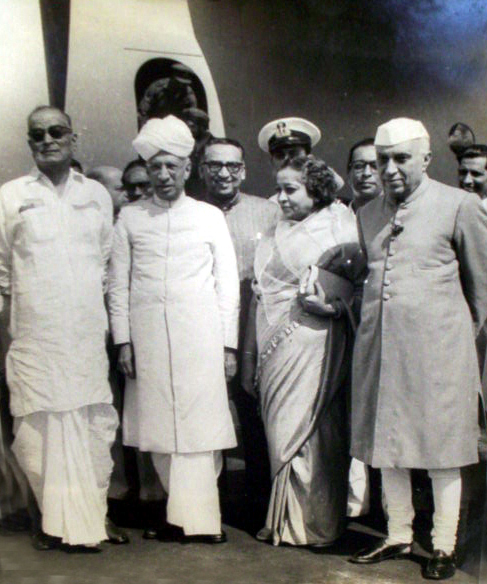
Ashoke Kumar Sen with President Sarvepalli Radhakrishnan, Nehru and Bidhan Chandra Roy

Because of his legal acumen, Bidhan Chandra Roy, Chief Minister of West Bengal, recommended him to the Prime Minister Jawaharlal Nehru. Nehru wanted Sen in his cabinet, and asked him to contest elections for the Lok Sabha.

In 1957, the Calcutta North West seat for the Lok Sabha was a communist stronghold. Sen had tried in 1956 to win the election, but fell short by only a few votes. However, in the following year, he triumphed and won by over 100,000 votes. He retained that seat from 1957 to 1977, and again held the Calcutta North West seat from 1980 to 1989, being defeated in 1989 by Debi Prosad Pal.

Sen was a Member of the Second, Third, Fourth, Fifth and Eighth Lok Sabhas.

He was later made a Rajya Sabha member and remained in the Upper House until April 1996, a few months before his death.

== Ministerial career ==
Ashoke Sen became the Union Law Minister under Nehru. It is this post for which he became famous worldwide. He was Union Minister of Law, but he also held other portfolios such as Communications. He was Minister of Steel and Mines in Chandra Shekhar government from November 1990 to June 1991.

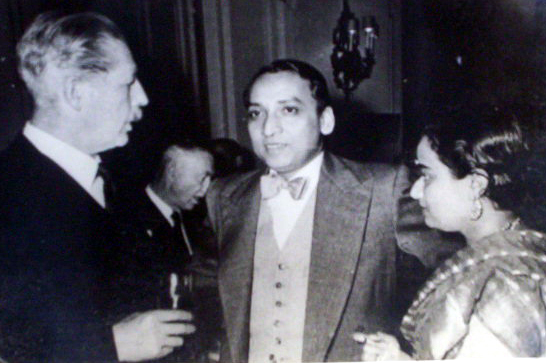
Ashoke Kumar Sen with Harold Macmillan, Prime Minister of the U.K

Over the next years, Sen was India's representative to foreign countries and the United Nations. According to Deve Gowda (1996), Sen led the Indian delegations to the United Nations Conference on Law, the United Nations Conference on Human Rights and several other conferences.

He was Law Minister lastly under Rajiv Gandhi and resigned in 1989 after his party's debacle in state elections in his home state West Bengal.

== Other activities ==
During his lifetime, Sen started the Paschim Banga Seva Samiti – a charitable organisation. He also served as the president of the Indian Football Association. During his lifetime, Mr Sen also amassed a large law library with many rare collections. This library is considered to be among the largest private law libraries in the world.

== Memorials ==
There is a block in the Supreme Court named after him. A portrait of him also hangs there. A town, Ashoknagar Kalyangarh in West Bengal is named after him. Several documentary films have also been produced on Sen.

== Family ==
Ashoke Kumar Sen was survived by his widow, Anjana (whom he married in 1943), and by his four children, and seven grandchildren.

Besides his brother Sukumar Sen, Ashoke Kumar Sen had another brother Amiya Kumar Sen, an associate of Rabindranath Tagore. Amiya, author of a book about the Tagore family newspaper, was formerly a lecturer at Calcutta University and Principal of the City College, Kolkata. Mr Sen is also uncle to Nobel Laureate Economist Amartya Sen.

== Sources ==
- Profile from India's Rajya Sabha (Upper House) website
- "The biggest gamble in history" The Hindu 27 January 2002, magazine section. Later reprinted as "Democracys biggest gamble: Indias first free elections in 1952. (Reconsiderations)." (partly available online) World Policy Journal 22 March 2002.
