= Sandipan Saha =

Indian politician (born 1978)

Deputy Leader of the Opposition in West Bengal
- Incumbent
- Assumed office 3 June 2026 Serving with Seuli Saha; Javed Ahmed Khan; Sabina Yeasmin
- Governor: R. N. Ravi
- Preceded by: Ashima Patra; Nayna Bandyopadhyay

Member of West Bengal Legislative Assembly
- Incumbent
- Assumed office 4 May 2026
- Preceded by: Swarna Kamal Saha
- Constituency: Entally

Personal details
- Born: 1978 (age 47–48) Kolkata, West Bengal, India
- Party: Democratic Trinamool Congress
- Parent: Swarna Kamal Saha (father)
- Education: Indian Institute of Management Calcutta (PGDM)
- Occupation: Politician, Businessman

Sandipan Saha (born 1978) is an Indian politician from West Bengal. He is a Member of the Legislative Assembly from Entally Assembly constituency in West Bengal. He was elected in the 2026 West Bengal Legislative Assembly election representing the All India Trinamool Congress.

== Early life and education ==
Saha is from Chowringhee, Kolkata, West Bengal. He is the son of former MLA Swarna Kamal Saha. He completed a Post Graduate Diploma in Management (PGDM) from Indian Institute of Management Calcutta in 2005. He runs his own business. He declared assets worth more than ₹11 crore in his affidavit to the Election Commission of India.

== Political career ==
Saha began his political career as a Councillor and later joined the All India Trinamool Congress. He contested the 2026 West Bengal Legislative Assembly election from Entally Assembly constituency. He polled 94,427 votes and defeated his nearest rival, Priyanka Tibrewal of the Bharatiya Janata Party, by a margin of 34,006 votes.

== Controversy ==
On 1 June 2026, the All India Trinamool Congress suspended Saha and another MLA, Ritabrata Banerjee, for alleged anti-party activities. The duo allegedly complained to the speaker that their signatures in a letter submitted by the Trinamool Congress to another speaker were forged.
