= Bowbazar Assembly constituency =

Former Legislative Assembly constituency in West Bengal, India

Coordinates: 22°34′12″N 88°21′32″E

Bowbazar
- Former constituency No. 145 for the West Bengal Legislative Assembly

Constituency details
- Country: India
- Region: East India
- State: West Bengal
- District: Kolkata
- Lok Sabha constituency: Calcutta North West
- Established: 1951
- Abolished: 2011
- Reservation: None

Bowbazar Assembly constituency was a Legislative Assembly constituency of Kolkata district in the Indian state of West Bengal.

== Overview ==
As a consequence of the orders of the Delimitation Commission, Bowbazar Assembly constituency ceases to exist from 2011.

It was part of Calcutta North West (Lok Sabha constituency).

== Members of the Legislative Assembly ==
Election Year	Elected Members	Party
1951	Dr. Bidhan Chandra Roy	Indian National Congress
1957	Dr.Bidhan Chandra Roy	Indian National Congress
1962	Bijoy Singh Nahar	Indian National Congress
1967	Bijoy Singh Nahar	Indian National Congress
1969	Bijoy Singh Nahar	Indian National Congress
1971	Bijay Singh Nahar	Indian National Congress
1972	Bijay Singh Nahar	Indian National Congress
1977	Abul Hassan	Communist Party of India (Marxist)
1982	Abdul Rauf Ansari	Indian National Congress
1987	Sudip Bandyopadhyay	Indian National Congress
1991	Sudip Bandyopadhyay	Indian National Congress
1996	Sudip Bandyopadhyay	Indian National Congress
1998^	Ajit Pandey	Communist Party of India (Marxist)
2001	Nayna Bandyopadhyay	Trinamool Congress
2006	Sudip Bandyopadyay	Indian National Congress
2009^	Swarna Kamal Saha	Trinamool Congress

== Results ==
=== 2009 Bye-election ===
A bye-election was held on 18 August 2009 following the resignation of the sitting MLA, Sudip Banerjee who was elected as MP In Parliament from Kolkata Uttar (Lok Sabha constituency).

In This Election, Swarnakamal Saha of Trinamool Congress Defeated Minati Gomez of CPIM - Supported Independent.

West Bengal state assembly bye election, 2009: Bowbazar constituency
Party	Candidate	Votes	%	±%
AITC	Swarna Kamal Saha	26,271		
Independent	Minati Gomez	4,851		
BJP	Ajay Kumar Bajpayee	2,366		
Turnout		39,650	27.69	−6.7
Swing to AITC from INC		Swing	+21.27	

=== 2006 ===
In the 2006 election, Sudip Bandyopadhyay of Congress defeated his nearest rival Rekha Singh of CPIM.

2006 West Bengal state assembly election: Bowbazar constituency
Party	Candidate	Votes	%	±%
INC	Sudip Bandyopadhyay	21,451	40.3	
CPI(M)	Rekha Singh	15,309	28.8	
AITC	Sultan Ahmed	15,135	28.4	
Independent	Sudipto Kumar Roy	391	0.7	
Independent	Sanjib Mukherjee	207	0.4	
Independent	Akbar Ali	196	0.4	
Independent	Md. Muslim	168	0.3	
Independent	Sajal Bandyopadhyay	165	0.3	
Independent	Sailen Auddy	107	0.2	
Independent	Barin Dutta	106	0.2	
Majority		6,142	11.5	
Turnout		53,236	54.4%	
INC gain from AITC		Swing		

=== 2001 ===
In the 2001 election, Nayna Bandyopadhyay of Trinamool Congress defeated his nearest rival Ajit Pandey of CPIM.

West Bengal state assembly election, 2001: Bowbazar constituency
Party	Candidate	Votes	%	±%
AITC	Nayna Bandyopadhyay	27,840	55.1	+21.85
CPI(M)	Ajit Pandey	15,892	31.5	−5.24
Independent	Syed Sahid Imam	3,039	6.0	
BJP	Arun Kumar Hazra	2,726	5.4	
Independent	Dilip Kumar Dutta	330	0.7	
Independent	Sumanta Bhowmick	281	0.6	
Independent	Subrata Singha	162	0.3	
Independent	Rathindar Nath Bhattacharya	130	0.3	
Independent	Khurshid Ali Afzal	96	0.2	
Majority		11,948	23.7%	
Turnout		50,504	43.3%	
AITC gain from CPI(M)		Swing		

=== 1998 Bye-election ===
A bye-election was held on 3 June 1998 following the resignation of the sitting MLA, Sudip Bandyopadhyay who was elected as MP In Parliament from Calcutta North West (Lok Sabha constituency).

West Bengal state assembly bye election, 1998: Bowbazar constituency
Party	Candidate	Votes	%	±%
CPI(M)	Ajit Pandey	19,903	36.73	
AITC	Nayna Bandyopadhyay	18,021	33.25	
INC	Abdur Rauf Ansari	15,711	28.99	
RJD	Prof. Syed Haider Hasan Kazimi	329	0.61	
Independent	Ajit Kumar Das	89	0.16	
Independent	Sujan Mukherjee	50	0.09	
Independent	Bablu Singh	45	0.08	
Independent	Aloke Chatterjee	28	0.05	
Independent	Ramen Pandey	16	0.03	
Majority		1,882	0.9	
Turnout		39,650	27.69	−6.7
CPI(M) gain from INC		Swing		

=== 1996 ===
In the 1996 election, Sudip Bandyopadhyay of Congress defeated his nearest rival Sujit Mandal of Janata Dal.

West Bengal Legislative Assembly election, 1996: Bowbazar constituency
Party	Candidate	Votes	%	±%
INC	Sudip Bandyopadhyay	36,579	59.4	
JD	Sujit Mandal	17,181	27.9	
BJP	Rajendra Kumar Gupta	3,039	8.9	
Independent	Shyamal Kumar Dutta	542	0.9	
AIIC(T)	Bratindra Naskar	364	0.6	
Independent	Joseph Rozario	284	0.5	
Independent	Pinaki Das	227	0.4	
Independent	Habul Mukherjee (Tarak)	207	0.3	
Independent	Md. Kasim	188	0.3	
ABHM	Saroj Bhattacharjee	110	0.2	
Independent	Bibekananda Paul	108	0.2	
Independent	Gautam Das Gupta	90	0.2	
Social Action	S.M. Mustafa	71	0.1	
Independent	Brindaban Chandra Dey	63	0.1	
Independent	Kamal Kumar Roy	42	0.1	
Independent	Narayan Chandra Ghosh	38	0.1	
Independent	Md. Saifuddin	36	0.1	
Majority		19,398	30.6%	
Turnout		63,365	56.8%	
INC hold		Swing		

=== 1991 ===
In the 1991 election, Sudip Bandyopadhyay of Congress defeated his nearest rival Joytilak Guharoy of CPIM.

West Bengal Legislative Assembly election, 1991: Bowbazar constituency
Party	Candidate	Votes	%	±%
INC	Sudip Bandyopadhyay	29,405	59.4	
CPI(M)	Joytilak Guha Roy	17,672	32.5	
BJP	Sanat Kumar Datta	6,573	12.1	
All India Dalit Muslim Minorities Suraksha Mahasangh	Salauddin	323	0.6	
LKD	Raju Anthony	121	0.2	
Independent	Indranil Kumar	69	0.1	
Independent	Bikram Sur	62	0.1	
Independent	Khurshid Ali Afzal	57	0.1	
Independent	Md. Zakir	48	0.1	
Independent	Bhuban Bhowmick	26	0.1	
Independent	Onkar Majumdar	9	0.0	
Majority		11,733	21.2%	
Turnout		55,471	53.4%	
INC hold		Swing		

=== 1987 ===
In the 1987 election, Sudip Bandyopadhyay of Congress defeated his nearest rival Md. Ismail of CPIM.

West Bengal Legislative Assembly election, 1987: Bowbazar constituency
Party	Candidate	Votes	%	±%
INC	Sudip Bandyopadhyay	30,333	56.7	
CPI(M)	Md. Ismail	19,591	36.6	
Independent	S. M. Shahabuddin Haider	1,871	3.5	
Bharatiya Janata Party	Anindya Gopal Mitra	694	1.3	
JP	Chandra Deep Giri	553	1.0	
Independent	Mohammed Musa	143	0.3	
Independent	Ashok Chakraborty	120	0.2	
Independent	Satya Deo Mishra	82	0.2	
Independent	Maniruddin	68	0.1	
Independent	Anil Kumar Sen	49	0.1	
Independent	Shakir Hussain	36	0.1	
Majority		10,742	19.6%	
Turnout		54,791	60.3%	
INC hold		Swing		

=== 1982 ===
In the 1982 election, Abdul Rauf Ansari of Congress defeated his nearest rival Abul Hassan of CPIM.

West Bengal Legislative Assembly election, 1982: Bowbazar constituency
Party	Candidate	Votes	%	±%
INC	Abdul Rauf Ansari	26,001	51.4	
CPI(M)	Abul Hassan	22,615	44.7	
BJP	Anindya Gopal Mitra	1,602	3.2	
Independent	Ramendra Bhusan Singh	252	0.5	
Independent	Md. Salim Khan	161	0.3	
Majority		3,386	6.5%	
Turnout		51,725	58.8%	
INC gain from CPI(M)		Swing		

=== 1977 ===
In the 1977 election, Abul Hasan of CPIM defeated his nearest rival Bijoy Krishna Dhandhania of Janata Party.

West Bengal Legislative Assembly election, 1977: Bowbazar constituency
Party	Candidate	Votes	%	±%
CPI(M)	Abul Hassan	13,996	38.54	
JP	Bijoy Krishna Dhandhania	11,670	32.13	
INC	Abdul Rauf Ansari	8,168	22.49	
Independent	Manabendra Ghosh	1,611	4.4	
Independent	Prakash Shaw	556	1.5	
Independent	K. B. Roy	182	0.5	
Independent	Hrishikesh Tewari	68	0.2	
Independent	Anindya Kumar Mitra	68	0.5	
Majority		2,326	6.3%	
Turnout		36,901	40.4%	
CPI(M) gain from INC		Swing		

In the 2009 by-election, necessitated by the election of sitting MLA, Sudip Bandyopadhyay, to the Parliament from the Kolkata Uttar (Lok Sabha constituency), Swarnakamal Saha of Trinamool Congress won the 145 Bowbazar assembly seat. In 2006, the seat was won by Sudip Bandyopadhyay of Congress defeating Rekha Singh of CPI(M). In 2001, the seat was won by Nayana Bandopadhyay of Trinamool Congress defeating Ajit Pandey of CPI(M). Sudip Bandopadhyay of Congress won the seat defeating Sujit Mandal of JD in 1996, Joytilak Guha Roy of JD in 1991 and Md. Ismail of CPI(M) in 1987. In 1982, Abdul Rauf Ansari of Congress defeated Abul Hasan of CPI(M). In 1977, Abul Hasan of CPI(M) won the seat defeating Bijoy Krishna Dhandhania of Congress.

=== 1951-1972 ===
Bijay Singh Nahar of Congress won the seat defeating Hashim Abdul Halim of CPI(M) in 1972 and 1971, D.C.Bhowmick of Forward Block in 1969, S.Gupta of Forward Bloc and H, Chatterjee and CPI(M) in 1967 and Md. Ismail of CPI in 1962. Dr. Bidhan Chandra Roy won the seat in 1957 defeating Md. Ismail of CPI by a narrow margin of 540 votes and Satyapriya Banerjee of Forward Bloc (Marxists) in independent India’s first election in 1951.
