= Haripada Bharati =

Indian politician

1st President of Bharatiya Janata Party - West Bengal
- In office 1980–1982
- Preceded by: office established
- Succeeded by: Dr. Vishnukant Shastri

Member of Legislative Assembly, West Bengal
- In office 1977–1982
- Preceded by: Ila Roy
- Succeeded by: Subrata Mukherjee
- Constituency: Jorabagan

Personal details
- Party: Bharatiya Janata Party
- Other political affiliations: Janata Party, Bharatiya Jana Sangh

Haripada Bharati (also known as "Master Mosai") was an Indian politician who served as the first president of Bharatiya Janata Party, West Bengal. In 1977 he was elected MLA from Jorabagan Assembly Constituency as a Janata Party candidate. He was also the Principal of Narasinha Dutt College, Howrah.

== Political career ==
He contested the General election of 1967 as Bharatiya Jana Sangh candidate from Calcutta North West and got 82,455 (21.08%) votes. In General election of 1971 he again contested as an independent candidate from the same constituency and got around 34,397 (21.08%) votes. In the year 1980, he again contested from Jadavpur as Janata Party candidate and got 31846 votes.
