= Subrata Mukherjee =

Indian politician (1946–2021)

Cabinet Minister, Government of West Bengal
- In office 20 May 2011 – 4 November 2021
- President: Ekdalia Evergreen Club, Kolkata (1971— 2021)
- Chief Minister: Mamata Banerjee
- Department: Panchayats & Rural Development; Public Enterprises; Industrial Reconstruction
- Preceded by: Surjya Kanta Mishra (Panchayats & Rural Development); Amit Mitra (Public Enterprises and Industrial Reconstruction)
- In office 2 April 1972 – 21 June 1977
- Chief minister: Siddhartha Shankar Ray
- Department: Information and Cultural Affairs
- Succeeded by: Buddhadeb Bhattacharjee
- Constituency: Ballygunge

Member of West Bengal Legislative Assembly
- In office 13 May 2011 – 4 November 2021
- Preceded by: Ahmed Javed Khan
- Succeeded by: Babul Supriyo
- Constituency: Ballygunge
- In office 10 May 1996 – 11 May 2006
- Preceded by: Anil Chatterjee
- Succeeded by: Subrata Bakshi
- Constituency: Chowranghee
- In office 1982–1996
- Preceded by: Haripada Bharati
- Succeeded by: Sanjoy Bakshi
- Constituency: Jorabagan
- In office 1971–1977
- Preceded by: Jyotibhushan Bhattacharya
- Succeeded by: Sachin Sen
- Constituency: Ballygunge

35th Mayor of Kolkata
- In office 12 July 2000 – 5 July 2005
- Deputy: Meena Devi Purohit
- Preceded by: Prasanta Chattopadhyay
- Succeeded by: Bikash Ranjan Bhattacharya
- Constituency: Ward No. 87

Pro-tem Speaker of the West Bengal Legislative Assembly
- In office 3 May 2021 – 8 May 2021
- Governor: Jagdeep Dhankhar

Personal details
- Born: 14 June 1946 Sarangabad, Bengal Presidency, British India
- Died: 4 November 2021 (aged 75) Kolkata, West Bengal, India
- Party: Trinamool Congress (1999–2005, 2009–2021)
- Other political affiliations: Indian National Congress (1969–1999, 2005–2009); Nationalist Congress Party (2005)
- Spouse: Chhandabani Mukherjee
- Parent: Ashok Mukherjee
- Education: BSc in anthropology (Bangabasi College) MSc in archaeology (University of Calcutta) PGD in Museology (University of Calcutta) PgCert in Cultural Anthropology (SOAS University of London)

Subrata Mukherjee (14 June 1946 – 4 November 2021) was an Indian politician affiliated with All India Trinamool Congress. He served as a cabinet minister of the government of West Bengal, and MLA of West Bengal Legislative Assembly. He was also the 35th Mayor of Kolkata from 2000 to 2005.

== Political career ==
=== Career with Indian National Congress ===
Mukherjee started his political career as a student activist during his higher education in Kolkata. He joined the Chhatra Parishad, a student organisation affiliated to the Indian National Congress, in the 1960s. During this period he made the acquaintance of Priya Ranjan Dasmunsi.

Mukherjee was considered one of the two close aides of former prime minister Indira Gandhi, along with Dasmunsi. CPIM leaders used a slogan "Indirar dui putra Priyo Ranjan o Subrata" (transl. Indira's two sons Priya Ranjan and Subrata).

In 1971 and 1972, Mukherjee was elected to the legislative assembly from the Ballygunge Assembly constituency. In 1972, he was appointed Minister of State in the Siddhartha Shankar Ray ministry as Minister of Information and Cultural Affairs. He also held an additional responsibility as Minister of State for local government.

He lost the Ballygunge Assembly constituency in 1977 when the Congress party was defeated by the Left Front amid huge anti-incumbency voting patterns. In 1982, he shifted to the Jorabagan Assembly constituency and represented it till 1996. He was elected to the Legislative Assembly from Chowranghee in 1996 and 2001.

=== Career with All India Trinamool Congress ===
In 1999, he joined with Mamata Banerjee, parting ways with the Indian National Congress. This decision came from the Congress MLA, as INTUC denied him the nomination to the governing body of the ILO for the second term. He was made the Mayor of Kolkata in 2000, as a Trinamool Congress candidate. However, even after being the Mayor as a Trinamool leader, he decided not to resign as a Congress member of the Legislative Assembly. As Mayor, he had planned a 300 ft-high Kolkata gate on EM Bypass, which would have cost Rs. 20-crore. However, the project could not go ahead, as it could not obtain clearance from the Pollution Control Board.

Mukherjee was also elected to the Assembly on a Trinamool Congress ticket in 2001 from Chowrighee. He also contested the Lok Sabha elections in 2004 from Calcutta North West constituency, but lost.

=== Polls of Kolkata Municipal Corporation ===
Ahead of the civic polls in 2005, Mukherjee quit Trinamool Congress following differences with the party chief, and joined the Nationalist Congress Party. He was able to cobble up an alliance with Congress and several marginal players under the platform of Paschimbanga Unnayan Mancha. Although he was able to get elected to the corporation, his front suffered a humiliating defeat.

Even after leaving Trinamool Congress, he did not resign as a Trinamool member in the legislative assembly until the end of its term in 2006.

=== Later career ===
In the 2006 state elections, he came third in the Chowranghee seat as a Congress candidate. In 2006, the Congress had also fielded Mukherjee for the biennial election for a Rajya Sabha seat, but he failed to win.

In 2009, he fought from Bankura Lok Sabha constituency on the Congress ticket and lost.

In May 2010, Mukherjee left the Indian National Congress again and rejoined Trinamool Congress, leaving the post of Pradesh Congress Working President. He contested the 2011 Assembly elections from the Ballygunge seat, which he retained in 2016 with increased margin.

=== Cabinet Minister ===
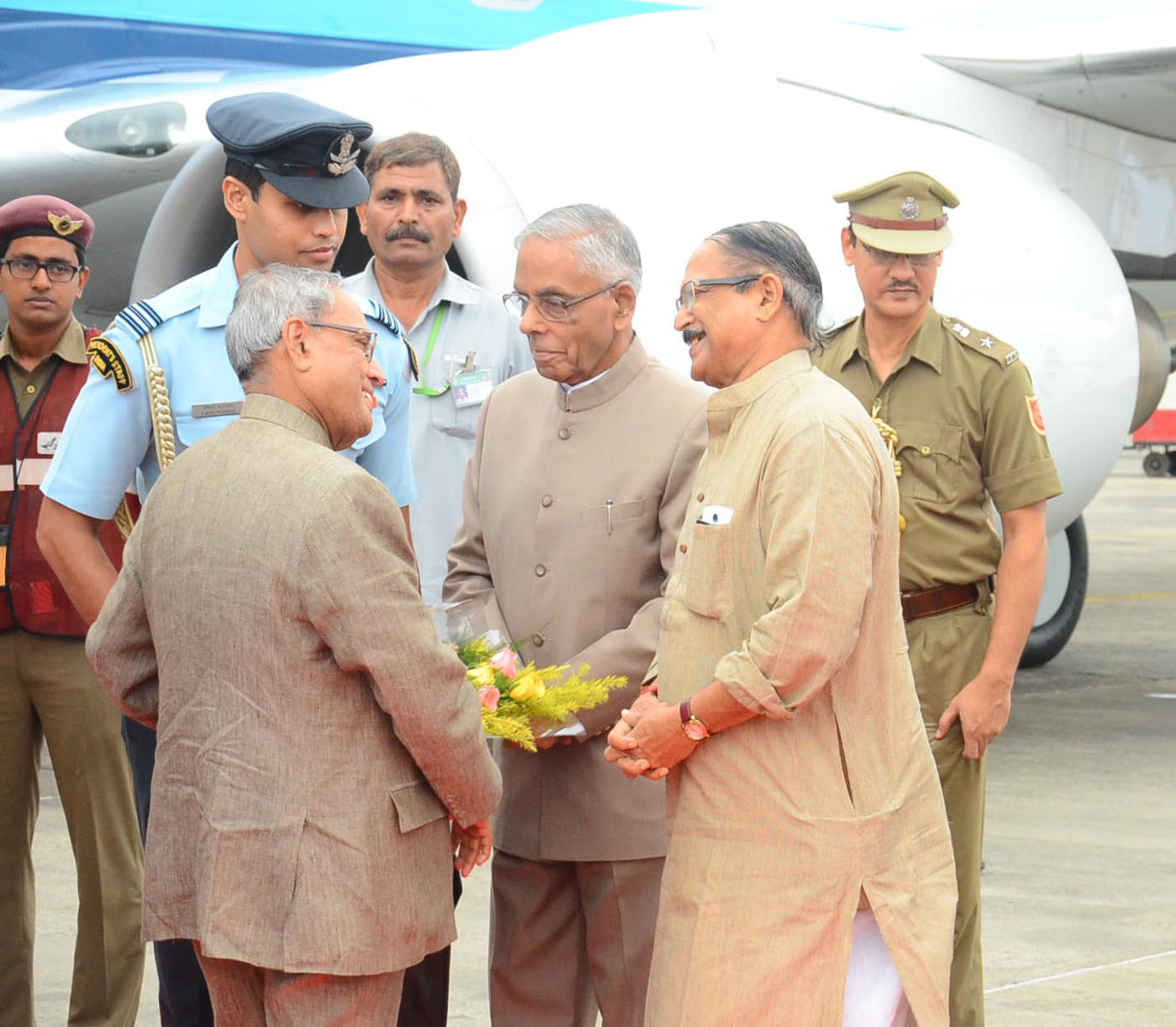
President of India Pranab Mukherjee being received by the Governor of West Bengal, M.K. Narayanan and West Bengal MIC, Public Health Engineering and Panchayat & Rural Development, Subrata Mukherjee, on his arrival.

In 2011, after the Trinamool Congress won a majority in the West Bengal Legislative Assembly, he was made Minister for Public Health Engineering under Chief Minister Mamata Banerjee. In December 2011, he was given the additional charge of Panchayati Raj & Rural Development ministry, and replaced Chandranath Sinha.

In February 2012, he was made the All India President of the INTTUC, instead of Sobhandeb Chatterjee. In the 2019 Loksabha elections, he fought from Bankura and lost to Subhas Sarkar of the BJP. He won with huge margin in 2021 vidhan sabha election from Ballygunge.

== Controversies ==
On 17 May 2021, Mukherjee, senior minister in the Mamata Banerjee cabinet Firad Hakim, MLA and former minister Madan Mitra and former Mayor of Kolkata Sovan Chatterjee were arrested by Central Bureau of Investigation in connection with the Narada sting operation.

== Death ==
He was hospitalised at SSKM Hospital, Kolkata on 24 October 2021 with serious heart problems and died of a heart attack on 4 November 2021 at the age of 75. He was cremated with full state honors at Keoratola crematorium the following day.

== Acting credit ==
Year	Title	Role	Channel	Note	Ref.
1989	Chowdhury Pharmaceuticals				

Political offices
Preceded by	Minister of Panchayats & Rural development in the West Bengal Government; 2011 – ?	Succeeded by Gautam Deb
State Legislative Assembly
Preceded by Jyotibhushan Bhattacharya	Member of the West Bengal Legislative Assembly from Ballygunge Assembly constituency 1971–1977	Succeeded by Sachin Sen
Preceded by Haripada Bharati	Member of the West Bengal Legislative Assembly from Jorabagan Assembly constituency 1982–1996	Succeeded by Sanjoy Bakshi
Preceded by Anil Chatterjee	Member of the West Bengal Legislative Assembly from Chowrangee Assembly constituency 1996–2006	Succeeded by Subrata Bakshi
Preceded by Javed Ahmed Khan	Member of the West Bengal Legislative Assembly from Ballygunge Assembly constituency 2011	Incumbent
