= Sudip Bandyopadhyay =

Indian politician (born 1949)

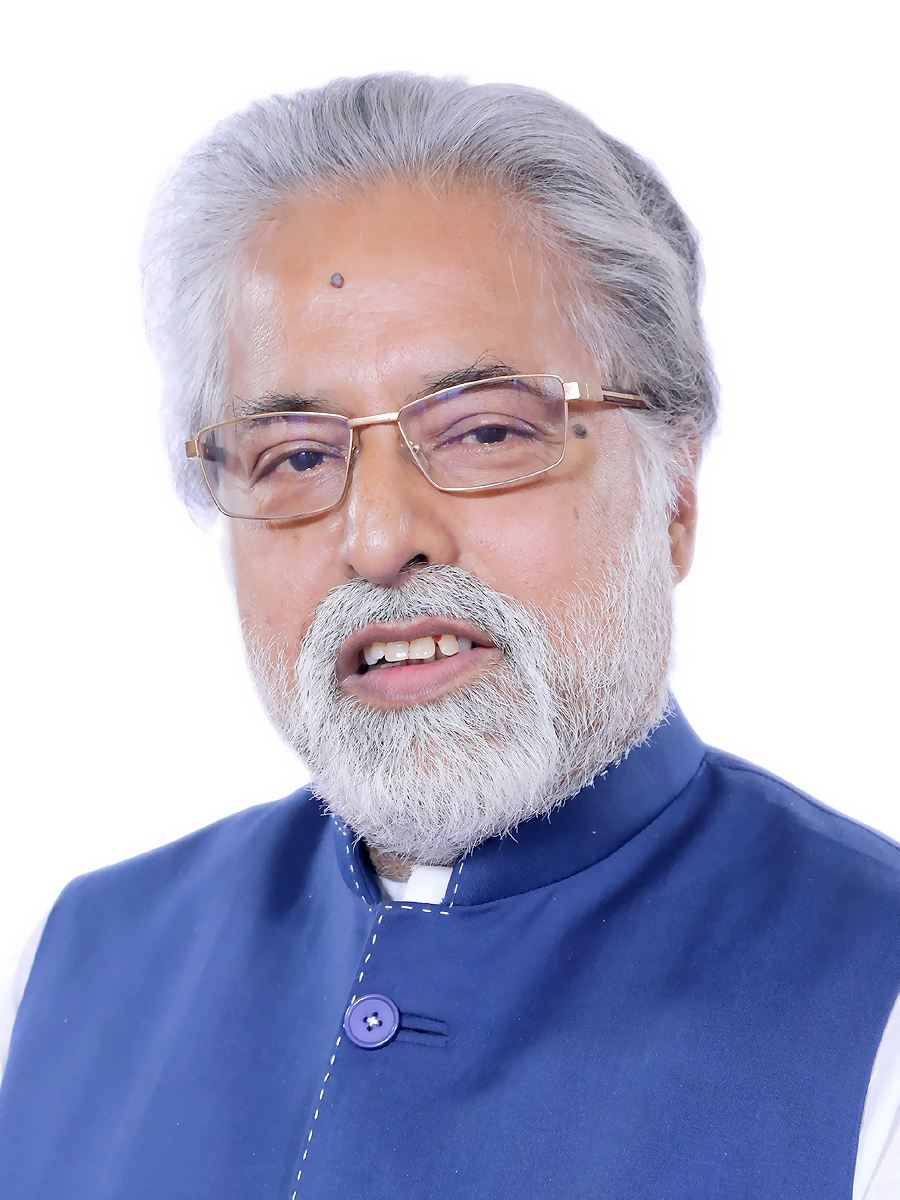
- Official portrait of Sudip Bandyopadhyay

Leader of Nationalist Citizens Party of India, Lok Sabha
- Incumbent
- Assumed office 16 June 2026
- Preceded by: Office established

Union Minister of State for Health and Family Welfares, Government of India
- In office 13 July 2011 – 22 September 2012
- Prime Minister: Manmohan Singh
- Preceded by: Dinesh Trivedi
- Succeeded by: Abu Hasem Khan Choudhury

Member of Parliament, Lok Sabha
- Incumbent
- Assumed office 25 May 2009
- Preceded by: New constituency
- Constituency: Kolkata Uttar
- In office 10 March 1998 – 16 May 2004
- Preceded by: Debi Prasad Pal
- Succeeded by: Sudhangshu Seal
- Constituency: Calcutta North West

Member of West Bengal Legislative Assembly
- In office 11 May 2006 – 16 May 2009
- Preceded by: Nayna Bandyopadhyay
- Succeeded by: Swarna Kamal Saha
- Constituency: Bowbazar
- In office 1987 – 1998
- Preceded by: Abdur Rauf Ansari
- Succeeded by: Ajit Pandey
- Constituency: Bowbazar

Personal details
- Born: Sudip Banerjee; 6 January 1949 (age 77) Behrampore, West Bengal, India
- Party: Nationalist Citizens Party of India (2026–present)
- Other political affiliations: Trinamool Congress (1998–2004, 2008–2026); Indian National Congress (1977–1998, 2004–2008)
- Spouse: Nayna Bandyopadhyay (m. 1991)
- Education: Murshidabad Maharaja Krishnanath University (B.Sc.)

Sudip Bandyopadhyay (born 6 January 1949) is an Indian politician and a Member of Parliament. He has been a member of the Lok Sabha for six terms, serving in the 12th, 13th, 15th, 16th, 17th, 18th Lok Sabhas. He represents the Kolkata Uttar constituency of West Bengal. He was the leader of Trinamool Congress political party in Lok Sabha until August 2025.

== Political career ==
On 3 January 2017, Bandyopadhyay was arrested after interrogation by the Central Bureau of Investigation (CBI) for his non-cooperation in ongoing investigation and alleged involvement in the Ponzi firm Rose Valley Group.

According to his 2019 nomination filing, his assets totaled ₹ 6 crores.

== Political career ==
He contested the 2024 Lok Sabha election on All India Trinamool Congress ticket from the Kolkata Uttar Lok Sabha constituency and retained his seat.

=== 2026 Rebellion ===
In June 2026, almost immediately after the massive Trinamool Congress defeat, around 20 MPs of AITC allegedly declared rebellion from their party, and presented their written wish to join Bhartiya Janata Party. This group was led by Kakoli Ghosh.

Later, on 14 June, 20 MPs, including Bandyopadhyay, signed a formal letter declaring their split from Trinamool Congress as to merge with the Nationalist Citizens Party of India (NCPI), having a national party status granted by the Election Commission of India. They formally submitted the letter to Lok Sabha Speaker Om Birla.

The total strength of TMC in Lok Sabha had been 28, so that a number of 20 MPs made it eligible for splitting from the party, as per the Indian Defection laws, so as to escape the anti-defection disqualification.

== Posts held ==
No.	Start	End	Position
1	1987	1991	Member, 10th Vidhan Sabha
2	1991	1996	Member, 11th Vidhan Sabha
3	1996	1998	Member, 12th Vidhan Sabha
4	1998	1999	Member, 12th Lok Sabha
5	1998	1999	Member, Committee on Public Undertakings
6	1998	1999	Member, Business Advisory Committee
7	1998	1999	Member, Committee on Urban and Rural Development
8	1998	1999	Member, Committee on Communications
9	1998	1999	Member, Consultative Committee, Ministry of Railways
10	1999	2004	Member, 13th Lok Sabha
11	1999	2000	Member, Committee of Privileges
12	1999	2000	Member, Committee on Finance
13	1999	2000	Member, Committee on Members of Parliament Local Area Development Scheme
14	1999	2000	Member, Committee on Labour and Welfare
15	1999	2000	Member, Committee on Public Undertakings
16	1999	2000	Member, Joint Parliamentary Committee on Wakf Board
17	2000	2001	Member, Committee on Public Undertakings
18	2000	2004	Member, Consultative Committee, Ministry of Railways
19	2006	2009	Member, 14th Vidhan Sabha
20	2009	2014	Member, 15th Lok Sabha
21	2009	2014	Member, Committee on Finance
22	2009	2014	Member, Consultative Committee on Defence
23	2011	2014	Leader, Trinamool Congress Parliamentary Party, Lok Sabha
24	2011	2012	Union Minister of State, Health and Family Welfare
25	2014	2019	Member, 16th Lok Sabha
26	2014	2019	Member, Business Advisory Committee
27	2014	2019	Leader, AITC Party in Lok Sabha
28	2014	2019	Member, Public Accounts Committee
29	2014	2019	Member, Committee on Finance
30	2014	2019	Member, Joint Committee on Salaries & Allowances of Members of Parliament
31	2014	2019	Member, Consultative Committee, Ministry of Civil Aviation
32	2014	2019	Member, Committee on Member of Parliament Local Area Development Scheme
33	2014	2019	Member, Joint Parliamentary Committee on Maintenance of Heritage Character and Development of Parliament House Complex
34	2015	2019	Member, General Purposes Committee, Lok Sabha
35	2016	2019	Chairperson, Standing Committee on Railways
36	2018	2019	Member, Samsad (Court) of Viswa-Bharati
37	2019	onwards	Member, 17th Lok Sabha
38	2019	onwards	Member, Business Advisory Committee
39	2019	onwards	Chairperson, Standing Committee on Food, Consumer Affairs and Public Distribution
40	2019	onwards	Member, Committee on Govt. Assurances
41	2019	onwards	Member, General Purposes Committee, Lok Sabha
42	2019	onwards	Member, Consultative Committee, Ministry of Civil Aviation
43	2020	onwards	Member, Samsad (Court) of Viswa-Bharati

== Election Contested ==
=== Lok Sabha ===
Year	Const.	Party	Votes	%	Opponent	Party	Votes	%	Result	Margin	%
2024	Kolkata Uttar	AITC	454,696	47.44	Tapas Roy	BJP	362,136	37.78	Won	▲92,560	▲9.66
2019	Kolkata Uttar	AITC	474,891	49.95	Rahul Sinha	BJP	347,796	36.59	Won	▲127,095	▲13.36
2014	Kolkata Uttar	AITC	343,687	35.94	Rahul Sinha	BJP	247,461	25.88	Won	▲96,226	▲10.06
2009	Kolkata Uttar	AITC	460,646	52.50	Md. Salim	CPI(M)	351,368	40.05	Won	▲109,278	▲12.45
2004	Calcutta North West	IND	81,952	22.76	Sudhangshu Seal	CPI(M)	151,772	42.15	Lost	▼69,820	▼19.39
1999	Calcutta North West	AITC	206,684	46.60	Rajdeo Goala	CPI(M)	112,514	25.37	Won	▲94,170	▲21.23
1998	Calcutta North West	AITC	226,832	49.07	Sarala Maheswari	CPI(M)	153,349	33.17	Won	▲73,483	▲15.90

=== West Bengal Legislative Assembly ===
Year	Const.	Party	Votes	%	Opponent	Party	Votes	%	Result	Margin	%
1987	Bow Bazar	INC	30,333	56.65	Md. Ismail	CPI(M)	19,591	36.59	Won	▲10,742	▲20.06
1991	Bow Bazar	INC	29,405	54.09	Jyotilak Guharoy	JD	17,672	32.51	Won	▲11,733	▲21.58
1996	Bow Bazar	INC	36,579	59.37	Sujit Mandal	JD	17,181	27.88	Won	▲19,398	▲31.49
2006	Bow Bazar	INC	21,451	40.29	Rekha Singh	CPI(M)	15,309	28.76	Won	▲6,142	▲11.54

== See also ==
- 12th, 13th & 15th Lok Sabha
- Lok Sabha
- Politics of India
- Parliament of India
- Government of India
- All India Trinamool Congress
- West Bengal

Lok Sabha
Preceded by Debi Prasad Pal	Member of Parliament for Calcutta North West; 1998 – 2004	Succeeded by Sudhangshu Seal
Preceded by Constituency did not exist	Member of Parliament for Kolkata Uttar; 2009 – Present	Incumbent
Party political offices
Preceded by Mamata Banerjee	Leader of the All India Trinamool Congress Party in the Lok Sabha; 13 July 2011 – 4 August 2025	Succeeded by Abhishek Banerjee
