= Entally Assembly constituency =

West Bengal Legislative Assembly constituency

Entally
- Constituency No. 163 for the West Bengal Legislative Assembly
- Interactive Map Outlining Entally Assembly Constituency

Constituency details
- Country: India
- Region: East India
- State: West Bengal
- District: Kolkata
- Lok Sabha constituency: Kolkata Uttar
- Established: 1951
- Total electors: 230,726
- Reservation: None

Member of Legislative Assembly
- 18th West Bengal Legislative Assembly
- Incumbent Sandipan Saha
- Party: DTC
- Elected year: 2026

Entally Assembly constituency is a Legislative Assembly constituency of Kolkata district in the Indian state of West Bengal. It is one of the seven vidhan sabha seats which fall under Kolkata Uttar Lok Sabha constituency.

== Overview ==
As per order of the Delimitation Commission in respect of the Delimitation of constituencies in West Bengal, Entally Assembly constituency is composed of the following:

- Ward Nos. 54, 55, 56, 58 and 59 of Kolkata Municipal Corporation.

Borough	Ward No.	Councillor	2021 Winner
VI	54	Amiruddin Wahab	Trinamool Congress
VI	55	Sabita Rani Das	Trinamool Congress
VII	56	Swapan Samaddar	Trinamool Congress
VII	58	Sandipan Saha	Trinamool Congress
VII	59	Jolly Bose	Trinamool Congress

Entally Assembly constituency is part of No. 24 Kolkata Uttar Lok Sabha constituency.

== Members of the Legislative Assembly ==
Year	Name	Party
1952	Devendra Chandra Dev	Indian National Congress
1957	Abu Asad Mohammed Obaidul Ghani	Communist Party of India
1962	Abu Asad Mohammed Obaidul Ghani	Communist Party of India
1967	Abu Asad Mohammed Obaidul Ghani	Communist Party of India
1969	Abu Asad Mohammed Obaidul Ghani	Communist Party of India
1971	Mohammed Nizamuddin	Communist Party of India (Marxist)
1972	Abu Asad Mohammed Obaidul Ghani	Communist Party of India
1974^	Sachindra Kumar Dhar	Communist Party of India
1977	Mohammed Nizamuddin	Communist Party of India (Marxist)
1982	Mohammed Nizamuddin	Communist Party of India (Marxist)
1987	Sultan Ahmed	Indian National Congress
1991	Mohammed Nizamuddin	Communist Party of India (Marxist)
1996	Sultan Ahmed	Indian National Congress
2001	Mohammed Salim	Communist Party of India (Marxist)
2004^	Mohammed Abu Sufayen	Communist Party of India (Marxist)
2006	Hashim Abdul Halim	Communist Party of India (Marxist)
2011	Swarna Kamal Saha	Trinamool Congress
2016	Swarna Kamal Saha	Trinamool Congress
2021	Swarna Kamal Saha	Trinamool Congress
2026	Sandipan Saha	Trinamool Congress

- ^ by-election

== Election results ==
=== 2026 ===
2026 West Bengal Legislative Assembly election: Entally
Party	Candidate	Votes	%	±%
AITC	Sandipan Saha	94,427	57.16	−7.67
BJP	Priyanka Tibrewal	60,421	36.57	+8.87
CPI(M)	Abdul Rauf	4,904	2.97	
INC	Kashif Reza	1,599	0.97	
NOTA	None of the above	692	0.42	−0.21
Majority		34,006	20.59	−16.54
Turnout		165,207	92.25	+24.28
AITC hold		Swing		

=== 2021 ===
2021 West Bengal Legislative Assembly election: Entally
Party	Candidate	Votes	%	±%
AITC	Swarna Kamal Saha	101,709	64.83	
BJP	Priyanka Tibrewal	43,452	27.7	
AISF	Mohammad Iqbal Alam	4,354	2.78	
Independent	Prabir Dasgupta	1,934	1.23	
NOTA	None of the above	991	0.63	
Majority		58,257	37.13	
Turnout		156,874	67.97	
AITC hold		Swing		

=== 2016 ===
2016 West Bengal Legislative Assembly election: Entally
Party	Candidate	Votes	%	±%
AITC	Swarna Kamal Saha	75,841	51.97	−4.27
CPI(M)	Debesh Das	47,853	32.79	−4.92
BJP	Sudhir Kumar Pandey	14,682	10.06	+7.67
NOTA	None of the Above	2,321	1.59	New
BSP	Anil Kumar	1,266	0.87	
Majority		27,988	19.18	+0.65
Turnout		1,45,944	70.68	+1.15
AITC hold		Swing	-4.27	

=== 2011 ===
2011 West Bengal Legislative Assembly election: Entally
Party	Candidate	Votes	%	±%
AITC	Swarna Kamal Saha	75,891	56.24	
CPI(M)	Debesh Das	50,895	37.71	
BJP	Sudhir Kumar Pandey	3,230	2.39	
IND	Prasenjit Sarkar	1,619	1.20	
BSP	Ram Janam Kori	824	0.61	
Majority		24,996	18.52	
Turnout		1,35,005	69.55	
AITC gain from CPI(M)		Swing		
