= Ajit Pandey =

Indian politician

Ajit Pandey MLA

Member of the West Bengal Legislative Assembly for Bowbazar
- In office 3 June 1998 – 16 May 2001
- Preceded by: Sudip Bandyopadhyay
- Succeeded by: Nayna Bandyopadhyay

Personal details
- Born: 10 March 1937 Lalgola Murshidabad, West Bengal, India
- Died: 13 June 2013 (aged 76)
- Party: CPI(M)
- Spouse: Aditi Pandey
- Parents: Satyendra Nath Pandey (father); Tarulata Pandey (mother)
- Occupation: Musician and politician
- Musical career
- Occupations: Musician and politician
- Years active: 1972–2013

Ajit Pandey (10 March 1937 – 13 June 2013) was an Indian singer and politician.

== Life ==
Born in 1937 in Lalgola, Murshidabad, Pandey became involved in both music and politics from an early age. During his career, he recorded over 30 albums, winning international awards from Russia, Bangladesh and Vietnam. He also served as a Member of the Legislative Assembly, representing the constituency of Bowbazar. He died of a heart attack in Kolkata at the age of 76.
