= Taltola Assembly constituency =

Former West Bengal Legislative Assembly constituency

Coordinates: 22°33′11″N 88°21′40″E

Taltola
- Former constituency No. 154 for the West Bengal Legislative Assembly

Constituency details
- Country: India
- Region: East India
- State: West Bengal
- District: Kolkata
- Lok Sabha constituency: Calcutta North West
- Established: 1951
- Abolished: 2011
- Reservation: SC

Taltola was a Legislative Assembly constituency of Kolkata district in the Indian state of West Bengal. It was reserved for scheduled castes.

== Overview ==
As a consequence of the orders of the Delimitation Commission, Taltola Assembly constituency ceases to exist from 2011.

It was part of Calcutta North West (Lok Sabha constituency).

== Members of the Legislative Assembly ==
Election Year	Constituency	Name of M.L.A.	Party affiliation
1951	Taltola	Moulavi Shamsul Haque	Indian National Congress
1957		Dhirendra Nath Dhar	Communist Party of India
1962		Karam Hossain	Indian National Congress
1967		Karam Hossain	Indian National Congress
1969		Abul Hassan	Communist Party of India (Marxist)
1971		Abdur Rauf Ansari	Indian National Congress
1972		Abdur Rauf Ansari	Indian National Congress
1977		Sumanta Kumar Hira	Communist Party of India (Marxist)
1982		Sumanta Kumar Hira	Communist Party of India (Marxist)
1987		Sumanta Kumar Hira	Communist Party of India (Marxist)
1991		Debesh Das	Communist Party of India (Marxist)
1996		Tapati Saha	Communist Party of India (Marxist)
2001		Debesh Das	Communist Party of India (Marxist)
2006		Debesh Das	Communist Party of India (Marxist)

== Results ==
=== 1977-2006 ===
In the 2006 and 2001 state assembly elections, Debesh Das of CPI(M) won the 154 Taltola assembly constituency (SC) defeating his nearest rivals Sumanta Kumar Hira and Dilip Kumar Das, both of Trinamool Congress. Tapati Saha of CPI(M) won it in 1996, defeating Sambhunath Kow of Congress. Debesh Das of CPI(M) defeated Utpal Shaw of Congress in 1991. Sumanta Kumar Hira of CPI(M) defeated Utpal Shaw of Congress in 1987, and Ardhendu Sekhar Naskar of Congress in 1982 and 1977 respectively.

=== 1951-1972 ===
In 1972 and prior to it the Taltala seat was an open seat. It was won by Abdur Rauf Ansari of Congress in 1972 and 1971. He defeated Abul Hassan of CPI(M) in both the years. Abul Hassan of CPI(M) won in 1969 defeating Karam Hossain of Congress. Karam Hossain of Congress won in 1967 defeating Abul Hassan of CPI(M) and 1962 Dhirendra Nath Dhar of CPI. Dhirendranath Dhar of CPI won in 1957 defeating Naresh Nath Mukherjee of Congress. Moulavi Shamsul Haque of Congress won in independent India's first general election in 1951 defeating Hirendra Nath Mukherjee of CPI.
