= Nayna Bandyopadhyay =

Indian politician and actress

- Nayna Bandyopadhyay in 2026

Deputy Leader of Opposition in West Bengal
- In office 9 May 2026 – 3 June 2026 Serving with Ashima Patra
- Preceded by: Mihir Goswami
- Succeeded by: Sandipan Saha; Seuli Saha; Javed Ahmed Khan; Sabina Yeasmin

Member of West Bengal Legislative Assembly
- Incumbent
- Assumed office 2014
- Preceded by: Sikha Chowdhury
- Constituency: Chowrangee
- In office 13 May 2001 – 11 May 2006
- Preceded by: Ajit Pandey
- Succeeded by: Sudip Bandyopadhyay
- Constituency: Bowbazar

Personal details
- Party: All India Trinamool Congress (2001–present) (until 2026); Mamata All India Trinamool Congress (from 2026)
- Born: 24 August 1968 (age 58); Jalpaiguri, West Bengal, India
- Education: ISC
- Occupations: Actress; Politician
- Years active: 1986–present
- Spouse: Sudip Bandyopadhyay (m. 1991)

Nayna Bandyopadhyay (née Das; born 24 August 1968) is an Indian politician and actress who is known for her work in Bengali cinema and television. She is the MLA of the Chowrangee Assembly constituency since 2014, as a All India Trinamool Congress candidate. She was the MLA of the Bowbazar Assembly constituency since 2001 till 2006, as a candidate from the same political party.

When she was in tenth grade, she made her debut opposite Prosenjit Chatterjee in Pathbhola (1986) directed by Tarun Majumdar' who changed her name into Nayana. She subsequently appeared in Bengali films such as Surer Akashe (1988), Aamar Tumi (1989), Prem Pratigya (1989), Tufan (1989), Anurag (1990), Balidan (1990), Pati Param Guru (1991), Shaitan (1992), Ghar Sansar (1993). She rose to wider fame and popularity for her role as Sita in Anup Sengupta's commercial hit Sinthir Sindur (1996). In most of her films including Sinthir Sindur, she starred opposite Tapas Paul. Her political career hit the crux when she defeated Somen Mitra in the 2016 West Bengal Legislative Assembly election.

== Acting career ==
Bandyopadhyay made her debut opposite Prosenjit Chatterjee in Tarun Majumdar's Pathbhola (1986) when she was in tenth grade. She acted the role of Rani. Her name was recommended by Haranath Chakraborty after Satabdi Roy refused the role. She then collaborated with Biresh Chatterjee in his romantic drama film Surer Akashe (1988). The film stars Tapas Paul and Debashree Roy in the lead. She played sister to Paul's character. The film became a major financial grosser at the box office. She once again collaborated with Biresh Chatterjee in his multistarer film Tufan (1989). The plot revolves around three estranged brothers played by Tapas Paul, Chiranjeet and Abhishek Chatterjee.

In 1996, Banerjee starred opposite Tapas Paul in Anup Sengupta's drama film Sinthir Sindur.

She featured in Raja Sen's Desh (2002). It also features Jaya Bachchan and Sabyasachi Chakraborty.

== Political career ==
She was a member of the West Bengal Legislative Assembly from Bowbazar Assembly constituency since 2001 till 2006, as a candidate from the same political party. In 2004, she was suspended as she made a comment in opposition to Mamata Banerjee. She defeated her strong Congress contender Somen Mitra by winning the Chowrangee Assembly constituency in the 2016 West Bengal Legislative Assembly election. She retained her seat by winning the Chowrangee constituency again in the 2021 West Bengal Legislative Assembly election.

In April 2023, Bandyopadhyay was seen sharing conversation with the West Bengal CM Mamata Banerjee. Reportedly, she attempted to touch the feet of the CM, but the latter disapproved her in doing so. The former then burst into tears. It was rumoured that she was denounced by the CM as the latter believed that her performance was not satisfactory. Bandyopadhyay later uploaded a photo of a letter written by the CM, on her official Facebook page. The letter was then made into giant hoardings.

== Filmography ==
=== Feature films ===
Year	Title	Role	Note	Ref.
1986	Pathbhola	Rani		
1988	Surer Akashe	Rinku		
1989	Amar Tumi			
1989	Prem Pratigya			
1989	Tufan	Soma		
1990	Anurag			
1990	Balidan			
1990	Shesh Aghat			
1991	Akanksha			
1991	Pati Param Guru	Pameli		
1992	Shaitan			
1993	Ghar Sansar			
1996	Miss Maitreyi			
1996	Sinthir Sindur	Sita		
1997	Matribhumi			
1998	Banglar Badhu	Purnima		
1998	Hingsa			
1998	Matir Manush			
2002	Desh	Shila Chatterjee		
2003	Alo			
2003	Zehad			
2007	Bandhu			

=== TV series ===
Year	Title	Role	Channel	Note	Ref.
1989	Bharat Premkatha	Gunakeshi			
1989	Chowdhury Pharmaceuticals				
	Ek Shunyo Ek				
2004	Alokito Ek Indu				
2004	Shanai				
