= Bengal Chatkal Mazdoor Union =

Trade union in India

Bengal Chatkal Mazdoor Union is a trade union of jute mill workers in West Bengal, India. The union is affiliated to the Centre of Indian Trade Unions. The general secretary of BCMU is Mangal Benbanshi and the president is Anadi Kumar Sahu
