= Jorabagan Assembly constituency =

Former Legislative Assembly constituency in West Bengal, India

Coordinates: 22°35′17″N 88°21′18″E

Jorabagan
- Former constituency No. 142 for the West Bengal Legislative Assembly

Constituency details
- Country: India
- Region: East India
- State: West Bengal
- District: Kolkata
- Lok Sabha constituency: Calcutta North West
- Established: 1951
- Abolished: 2011
- Reservation: None

Jorabagan Assembly constituency was a Legislative Assembly constituency of Kolkata district in the Indian state of West Bengal.

== Overview ==
As a consequence of the orders of the Delimitation Commission, Jorabagan Assembly constituency ceases to exist from 2011.

It was part of Calcutta North West (Lok Sabha constituency).

== Members of the Legislative Assembly ==
Election Year	Constituency	Name of M.L.A.	Party affiliation
1951	Jorabagan	Ram Lagan Roy	Indian National Congress
1957		Nepal Chandra Roy	Indian National Congress
1962		Nepal Chandra Roy	Indian National Congress
1967		Haraprasad Chatterjee	Communist Party of India (Marxist)
1969		Nepal Chandra Roy	Indian National Congress
1971		Nepal Chandra Roy	Indian National Congress
1972		Ila Roy	Indian National Congress
1977		Haripada Bharati	Janata Party
1982		Subrata Mukherjee	Indian National Congress
1987		Subrata Mukherjee	Indian National Congress
1991		Subrata Mukherjee	Indian National Congress
1996		Sanjoy Bakshi	Indian National Congress
2001		Sudhansu Seal	Communist Party of India (Marxist)
2004by		Parimal Biswas	Communist Party of India (Marxist)
2006		Parimal Biswas	Communist Party of India (Marxist)

== Results ==
=== 1977-2009 ===
In the 2006 state assembly elections, the 142 Jorabagan seat was won by Parimal Biswas of CPI(M) defeating his nearest rival Sanjoy Bakshi of Trinamool Congress. In the 2004 by-elections, Parimal Biswas of CPI(M) defeated Rajesh Kumar Sinha of Congress. The by-election was necessitated by the election of sitting MLA, Sudhansu Seal to parliament from Calcutta North West (Lok Sabha constituency). Sudhansu Seal of CPI(M) defeated Sanjoy Bakshi of Trinamool Congress in 2001. Sanjoy Bakshi representing Congress defeated Sarala Maheswari of CPI(M) in 1996.Subrata Mukherjee of Congress defeated Shantilal Jain of BJP in 1991, and Sarla Maheswari of CPI(M) in 1987 and 1982. Haripada Bharati of Janata Party defeated Hara Prasad Chatterjee of CPI(M) in 1977.

=== 1951-1972 ===
Ila Roy of Congress defeated Haraprasad Chatterjee of CPI(M) in 1972. Nepal Chandra Roy of Congress defeated Haraprasad Chatterjee of CPI(M) in 1971 and 1969. Haraprasad Chatterjee of CPI(M) defeated Nepal Chandra Roy of Congress in 1967. Nepal Chandra Roy of Congress defeated Ajit Kumar Biswas of Forward Bloc (Marxist) in 1962 and 1957. Ram Lagan Roy of Congress defeated Ardhansu Mitra of CPI in independent India’s first election in 1951.
