= Sukumar Sen (civil servant) =

Indian civil servant

1st Chief Election Commissioner of India
- In office 21 March 1950 – 19 December 1958
- Appointed by: Rajendra Prasad
- Preceded by: Office established
- Succeeded by: Kalyan Sundaram

Personal details
- Born: 2 January 1898
- Died: 13 May 1963 (aged 65)
- Spouse: Gouri Sen
- Children: 4
- Education: Presidency College, Calcutta; University of London
- Occupation: Civil servant
- Known for: First Election Commissioner of India; First Vice-Chancellor of University of Burdwan
- Awards: Padma Bhushan

Sukumar Sen (2 January 1898 – 13 May 1963) was an Indian civil servant who was the 1st Chief Election Commissioner of India, serving from 21 March 1950 to 19 December 1958. Under his leadership, the Election Commission successfully administered and oversaw independent India's first two general elections, in 1951–52 and in 1957. He also served as first Chief Election Commissioner in Sudan in 1953.

Sen was born on 2 January 1899 in a Bengali Baidya-Brahmin family. He was the elder or eldest son of a civil servant Akshoy Kumar Sen. He was educated at Presidency College, Kolkata and at the University of London. He was awarded a gold medal in Mathematics at the latter. In 1921, Sen joined the Indian Civil Service, and served in various districts as an ICS officer and as a judge. In 1947, he was appointed Chief Secretary of West Bengal, the senior-most rank that an ICS officer could attain in any state in British India. He was still serving in that capacity when he was sent on deputation as chief election commissioner in 1950. He was among the first recipients of the civilian honour of Padma Bhushan. He married Gouri and had two sons and daughters each with her.

Sen was the elder brother of Ashoke Kumar Sen (1913–1996), Union Law Minister and a noted Indian barrister. Another brother was Amiya Kumar Sen, an eminent doctor, who was the last man to see Rabindranath Tagore alive. It is said that Amiya Sen preserved Tagore's last poem, which he had written down at the poet's dictation, and later donated it to Indian Museum in Kolkata.

== Chief Election Commissioner ==
Sukumar Sen, in his role as the Chief Election Commissioner of India, was charged with overseeing the 1952 Indian General Election, which was the first election in the history of independent India.

Historian Ramachandra Guha wrote of Sukumar Sen in The Hindu in 2002, on the 50th anniversary of independent India's first general election:

Nehru's haste [in wanting India's first general election] was understandable, but it was viewed with some alarm by the man who had to make the election possible, a man who is an unsung hero of Indian democracy. It is a pity we know so little about Sukumar Sen. He left no memoirs and, it appears, no papers either. ...

It was perhaps the mathematician in Sen, which made him ask the prime minister to wait. No officer of State, certainly no Indian official, has ever had such a stupendous task placed in front of him. Consider, first of all, the size of the electorate: 176 million Indians aged 21 or more, of whom about 85 per cent could not read or write. Each voter had to be identified, named and registered. This registration of voters was merely the first step. For how did one design party symbols, ballot papers and ballot boxes for a mostly unlettered electorate? Then, polling stations had to be built and properly spaced out, and honest and efficient polling officers recruited. Voting has to be as transparent as possible, to allow for the fair play of the multiplicity of parties that would contest. Moreover, with the general election would take place elections to the State Assemblies. Working with Sukumar Sen in this regard were the election commissioners of the different provinces, also I.C.S. men.

Tinker and Walker write that Sukumar Sen was aided by two Regional Election Commissioners plus one Chief Election Officer for each state.

The ability of India's first political leaders to refrain from interfering with the machinery, as well as their decision to retain the Indian Civil Service (renamed the Indian Administrative Service with a few minor changes) gave Sen and his colleagues the freedom to adapt the machinery used by the British in the first Indian elections for the purposes of a general election. Niaz comments:

Though not always successful, Nehru took it upon himself to shield the higher bureaucracy against any arbitrary interference and allowed it to operate autonomously.

This approach paid handsome dividends. Sukumar Sen and his colleagues in the IAS developed and adapted the election machinery inherited from the British Empire in India in preparation for elections on the basis of universal adult franchise.

With their positions secure and their political master sufficiently enlightened to understand when to stop engaging in politics, a hierarchy of IAS officers employed at the central, provincial, and district levels in coordination with the police and village watchmen administered the largest exercises in the history of electoral democracy. The autonomy and integrity of the IAS was a crucial element in motivating opposition parties to participate in the elections and thus contributed to the credibility of the democratic exercise.

Sen also oversaw the 1957 Indian General Election and used the existing election infrastructure to reduce costs and improve efficiency for the 1957 election. Guha writes: "this general election cost the exchequer ₹45 million less than the previous one. The prudent Sen had safely stored the 3.5 million ballot boxes the first time round and only half a million additional ones were required".

== Other activities ==
Sen was the first Vice-Chancellor of Burdwan University, which started on 15 June 1960. Uday Chand Mahtab and the then Chief Minister of West Bengal, Dr. Bidhan Chandra Roy, facilitated the establishment of this university. As a mark of respect and to perpetuate his memory the road leading from G.T. Road to Golapbagh, Burdwan has been named after him as Sukumar Sen Road. Further a street in Sudan has also been named after him to mark a respect and for the conduct of election there in 1953.

== Sources ==
- Ramachandra Guha (2002). *" The biggest gamble in history" The Hindu 27 January 2002, magazine section. Later reprinted as "Democracys biggest gamble: Indias first free elections in 1952. (Reconsiderations)." (partly available online) World Policy Journal 22 March 2002.
- Ramachandra Guha (2007). 1957The Hindu 4 March 2007, magazine section. Guha praises Sen as "a man of great intelligence and integrity."
- Justin Willis. "'A Model of its Kind': Representation and Performance in the Sudan Self-government Election of 1953", The Journal of Imperial and Commonwealth History, Volume 35, Issue 3 September 2007, pages 485 - 502
- Irene Tinker, Mil Walker. JSTOR. "JSTOR: The First General Elections in India and Indonesia". Far Eastern Survey, Vol. 25, No. 7 (Jul., 1956), pp. 97–110 (available via subscription only).
