= Entally =

Coordinates: 22°34′08″N 88°22′05″E

- Neighborhood of Kolkata
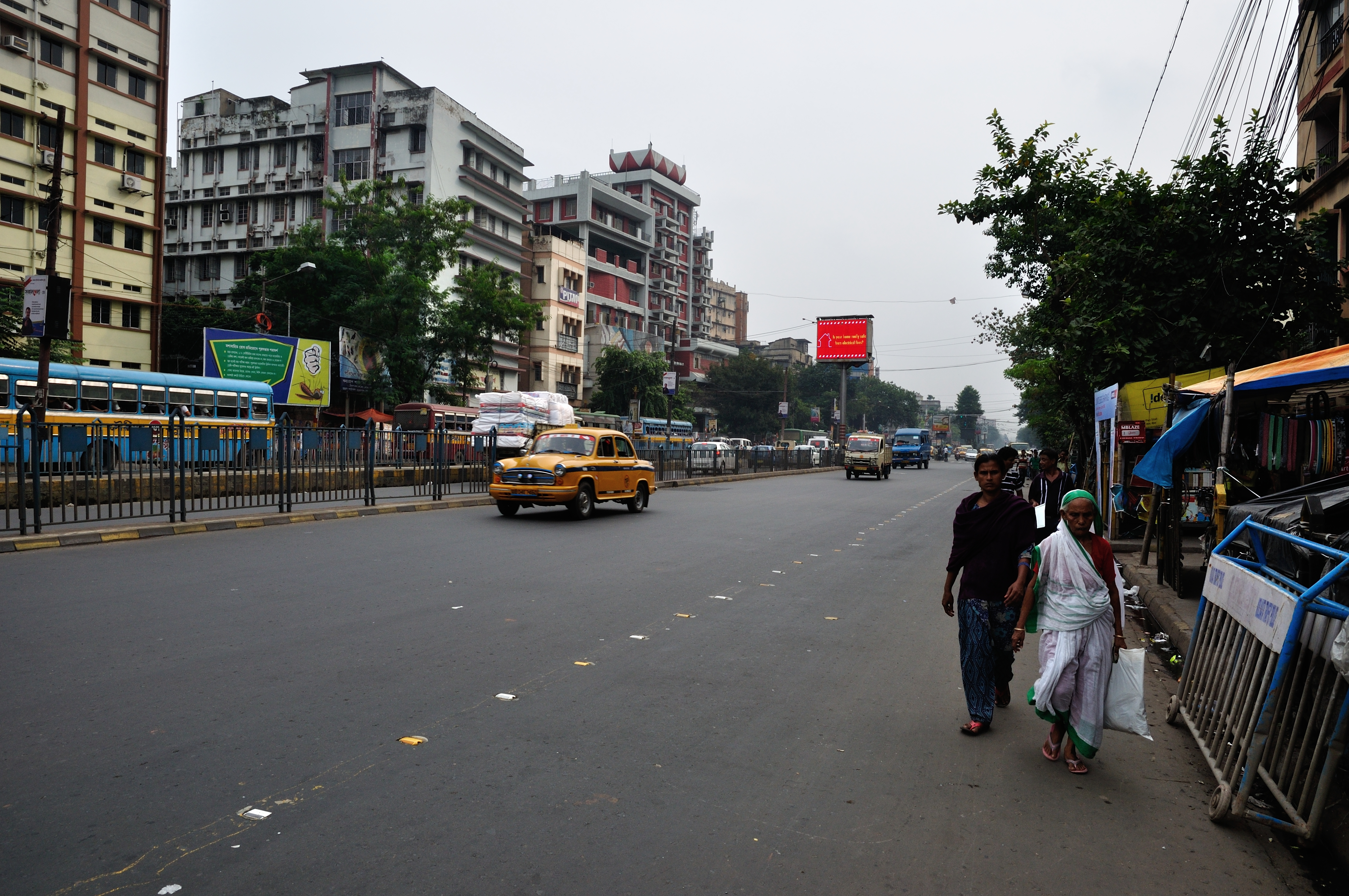
- AJC Bose Road, Entally

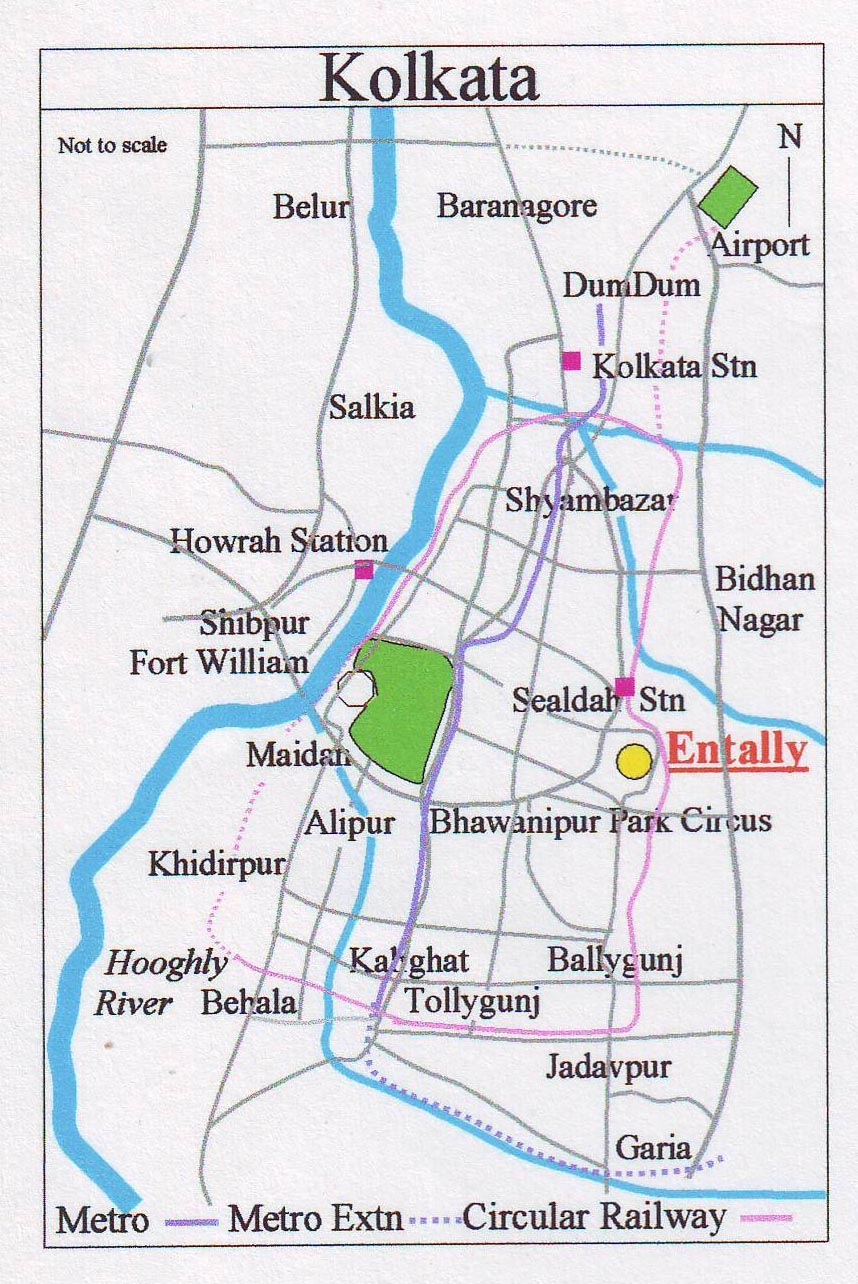
- Country: India
- State: West Bengal
- City: Kolkata
- District: Kolkata
- Metro Station: Sealdah
- Municipal Corporation: Kolkata Municipal Corporation
- KMC wards: 54, 55, 56

Government
  - MLA: Swarnakamal Saha (TMC)
- Elevation: 36 ft (11 m)

Population
  - Total: For population see linked KMC ward pages
- Time zone: UTC+5:30 (IST)
- PIN: 700014
- Area code: +91 33
- Lok Sabha constituency: Kolkata Uttar
- Vidhan Sabha constituency: Entally

Entally (also spelt Entali) is a neighbourhood of Central Kolkata, in Kolkata district in the Indian state of West Bengal. It was considered close to the area which was home to the poor and the depressed castes. Mother Teresa started her activities in Entally.

== History ==
The East India Company obtained from the Mughal emperor Farrukhsiyar, in 1717, the right to rent from 38 villages surrounding their settlement. Of these, five lay across the Hooghly in what is now Howrah district. The remaining 33 villages were on the Calcutta side. After the fall of Siraj-ud-daulah, the last independent Nawab of Bengal, it purchased these villages in 1758 from Mir Jafar and reorganised them. These villages were known en-bloc as Dihi Panchannagram and Entally was one of them. It was considered to be a suburb beyond the limits of the Maratha Ditch.

Odia palanquin-bearers, poor Christians, Muslims, Chinese and other depressed communities such as Dalits, lived in the area. Upper caste Hindus avoided living in the area because of the municipal slaughter house, Chinese-owned tanneries and piggeries (near Tangra which is close to Entally). However upper-class European resided in the Entally post office (originally known as Intally Post Office) neighbourhood. Rich Hindu milk businessmen (Gwala, Gop, Sadgop and Ghosh community) occupied an area near the Entally market and forbade low caste people to come near their locality (Gopelane, Panbagan Lane).

H. E. A. Cotton describes Entally in the twentieth century as "an area extensively intersected with numerous roads and lanes. It contains a large number of European residences, some of them fine buildings in extensive grounds." Situated in 155A AJC Bose Road near Entally Market stands the house of Henry Derozio (European by origin) pioneer of Bengal Renaissance and Young Bengal movement.

In those days, the Municipal Railway ran along the side of Lower Circular Road (renamed Acharya Jagadish Chandra Bose Road) and the Lakes by way of Sealdah and conveyed several hundred tonnes of sweepings daily which were employed to raise a square mile of land, which had been bunded off from the lanes for the purpose. South of Entally was the Volunteer Rifle Range constructed in 1877.

In the nineteenth century many factories were set up in Entally because of the low cost of land. Many of them survive to this day.

Entally, Manicktala, Beliaghata, Ultadanga, Chitpur, Cossipore, parts of Beniapukur, Ballyganj, Watganj and Ekbalpur, and parts of Garden Reach and Tollygunj were added to Kolkata Municipal Corporation in 1888. Garden Reach was later taken out.

In 1888, one of the 25 newly organized police section houses was located in Entally.

== Geography ==
Entally is spread over parts of Ward Nos. 54, 55 and 56 of Kolkata Municipal Corporation, partly under Entally police station and partly under Beniapukur police station. It is bounded by Sealdah and Beliaghata in the north, Tangra in the east, Beniapukur in the south and Taltala in the west.

=== Police district ===
Entally police station is part of the Eastern Suburban division of Kolkata Police.

Ultadanga Women police station covers all police districts under the jurisdiction of the Eastern Suburban division i.e Beliaghata, Entally, Maniktala, Narkeldanga, Ultadanga, Tangra and Phoolbagan.

== Economics ==
Entally market is one of the old markets in Kolkata under Kolkata Municipal Corporation (KMC). Shops sell ready-made garments, vegetables, groceries, textiles, margarine, flowers, stationeries, fish and fruits. This market was once famously known for its dairy product shops that provided high quality dairy items such as paneer, ghee, yogurt, condensed milk, cheese and butter.

== Culture ==
Mother Teresa arrived in Kolkata in 1928. While teaching in Loreto Convent at Entally, the slums beyond the school compound engaged her more and more. In 1948, when she secured permission to work fully with the poor and the sick, she established a home in an obscure house in Entally, with a nurse's training and a meager Rs. 5 in her pocket. Her activities spread out subsequently to other areas of Kolkata.

Gope Lane Shiva Temple (Sridhar Jew Mandir) is the oldest Hindu temple of Entally established by local Ghosh community. It was a centre for social reforms and freedom fighting during British colonial rule. It was also the centre of movements for social justice and cultural development of the non-higher caste Hindus and minorities. Later such movements got recognised by government with the formation of the other backward classes (OBC) ensuring social justice. Prafulla Chandra Ghosh, the 1st chief minister of West Bengal during his tenure from 1947 to 1948 addressed several meetings in this place. He gave importance to educational and overall cultural development of non-upper caste Hindu's, depressed communities, Dalits and minorities. For uplifting backward classes Sir Jnan Chandra Ghosh suggested developing institution for technical education which was later realised by establishment of Central Calcutta Pyrotechnic in Entally. Pandit Pannalal Ghosh credited with popularizing the flute as a concert instrument in Hindustani classical music used to perform music concerts along with Padma Bhushan Pandit Jnan Prakash Ghosh and other distinguished musicians in Gope Lane.

Sri Sri Radha Mohan Jew temple house is situated in Panbagan Lane in Entally. Many cultural events, social gatherings and seasonal festivals are held here. It is considered to be first establishment in Calcutta to perform daily worship and bhajan of Satya Sai Baba.

Lay Disciple of Sri Ramakrishna, Debendra Nath Majumdar, established Sri Ramakrishna Archanalaya at 39, Deb Lane, Entally in 1902. Devendra Nath started regular worship of Sri Ramakrishna there. He composed many devotional songs while spreading the spiritual practice and teaching of his Master Sri Ramakrishna in the locality until his demise in 1911. People often sing the hymn of eight stanzas 'Bhava-Sagara'...and ending with 'Gurudeva daya-kara dina jane' but very few people know the composer Mahatma Debendra Nath Majumdar, Lay disciple of Sri Ramakrishna Deb. Hearing this song Swami Brahmananda (First president of Ramakrishna Math & Mission) commented, "Debendra composed that song while absorbed in a high plane of consciousness, beyond the reach of ordinary people." Archanalaya celebrated 100 years in 2002 and renovated the old temple with a full-sized seated statue of Sri Ramakrishna there, inaugurated by Swami Gahanananda, Vice president of Ramakhrishna Mission that time.

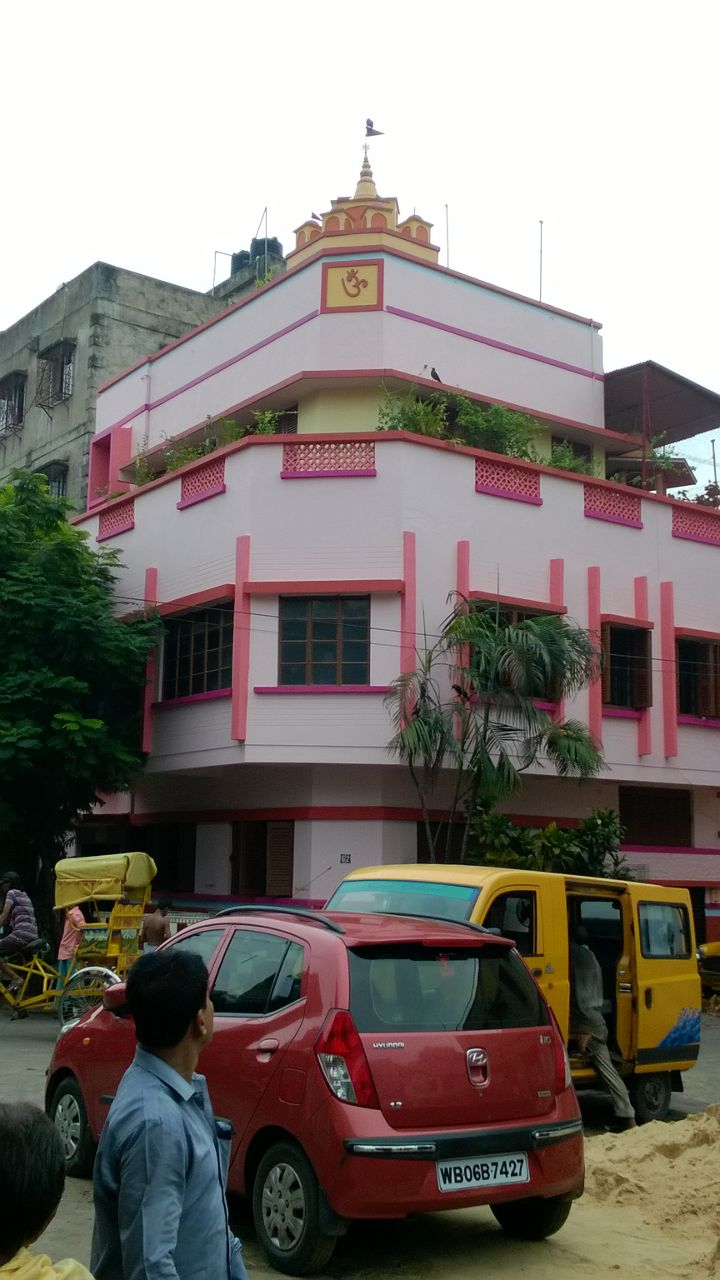

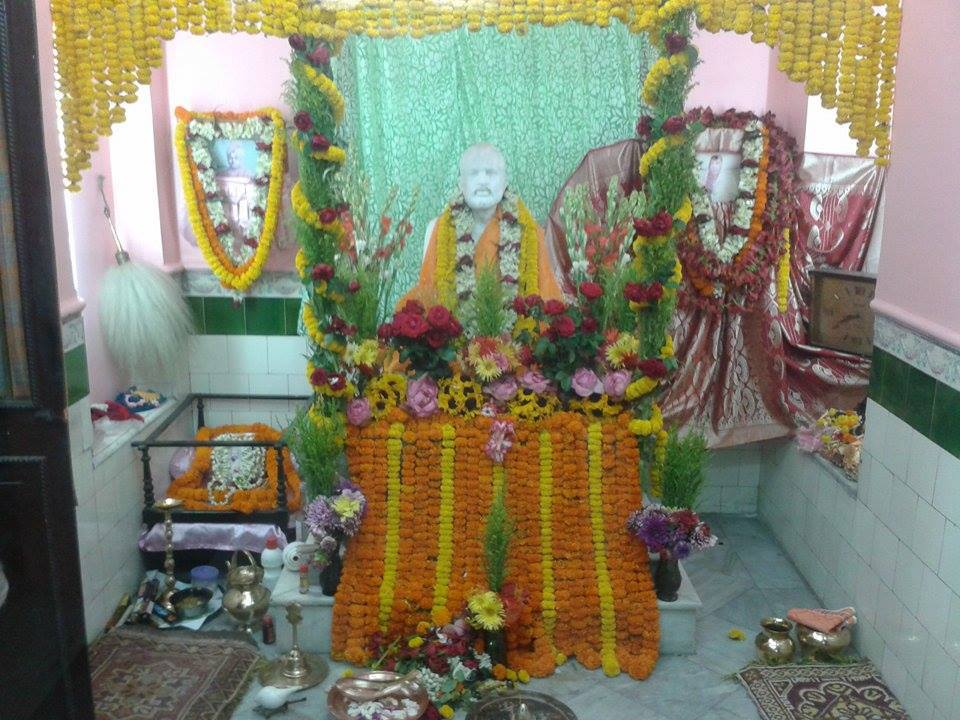

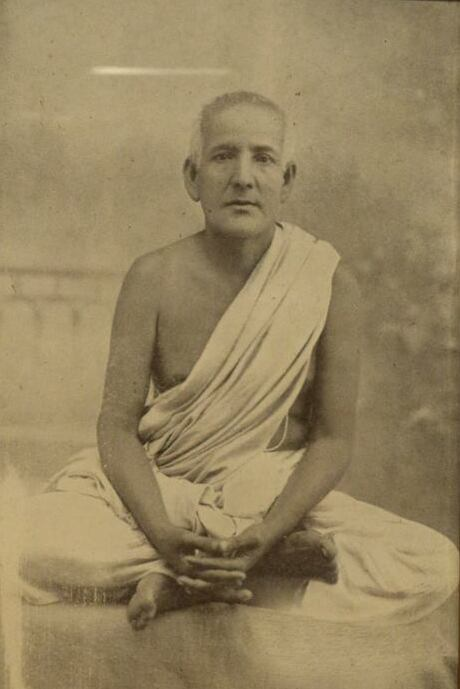

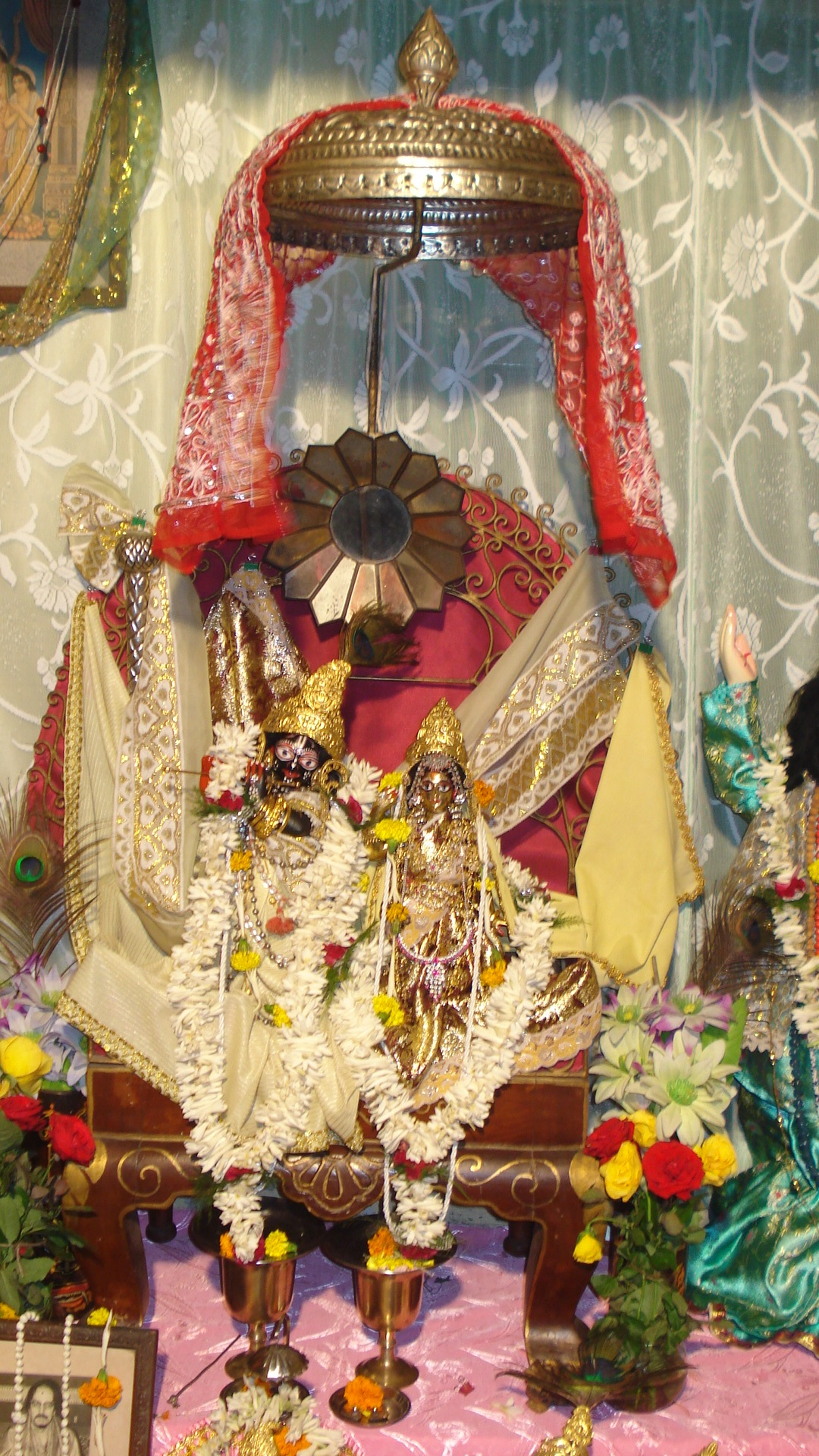

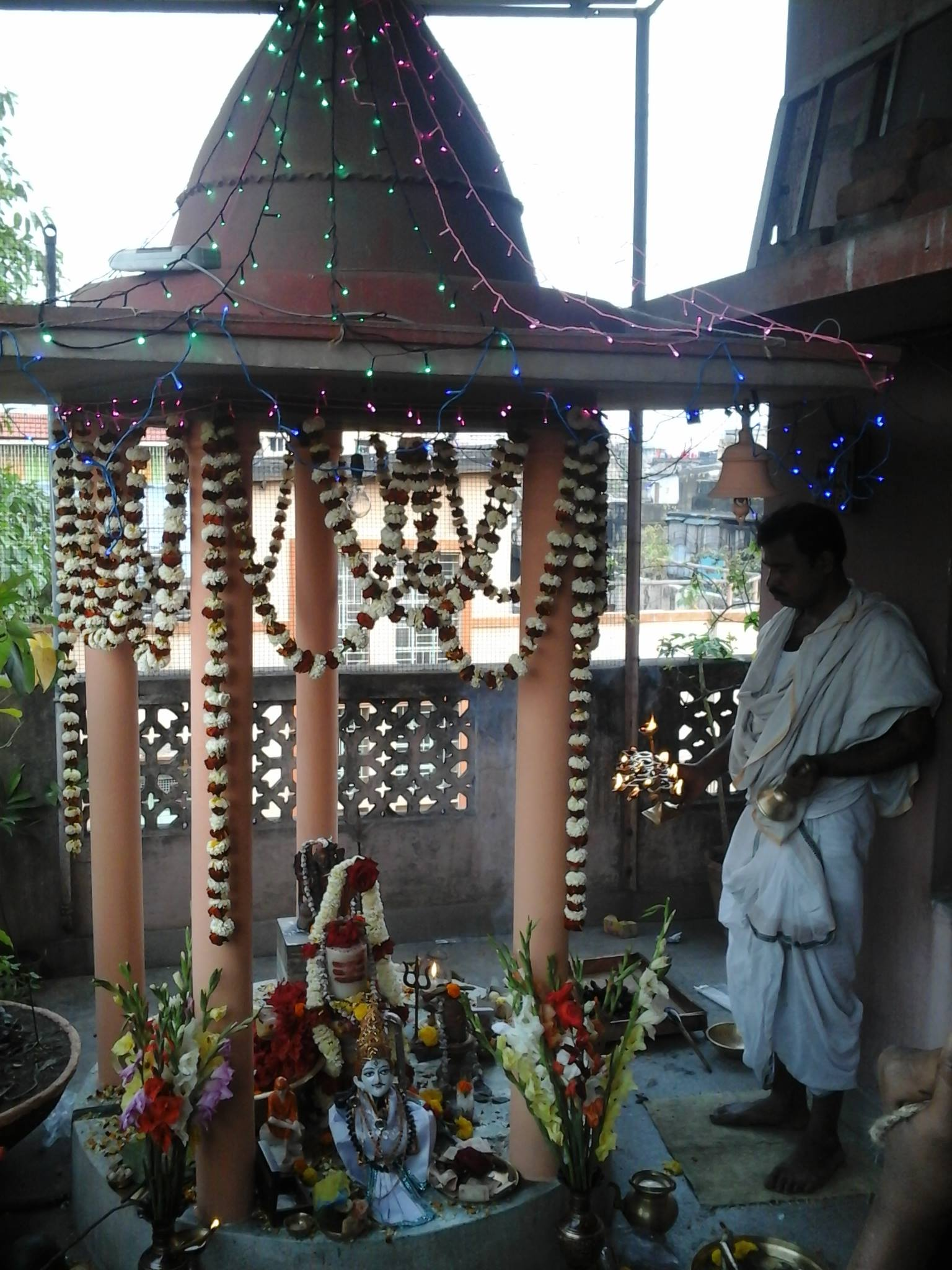

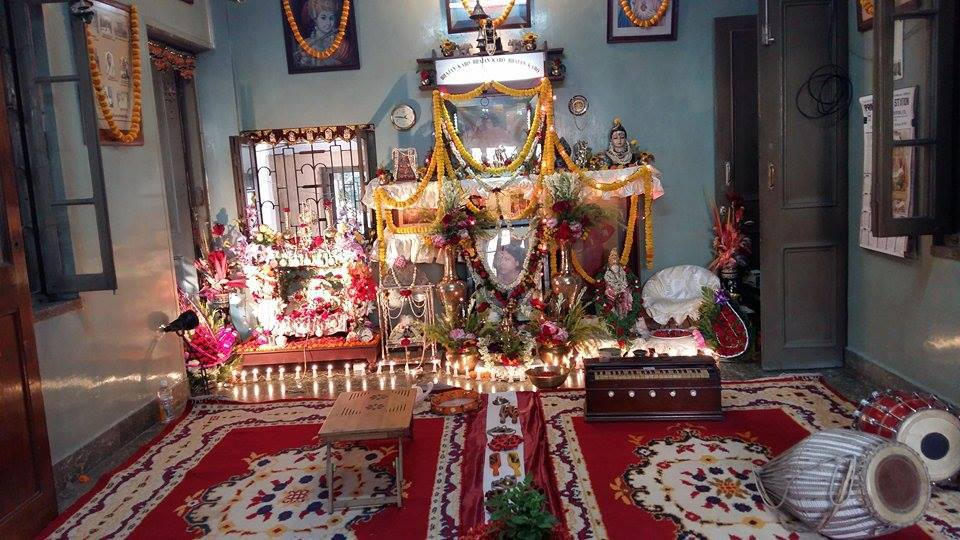

== Education ==
Loreto Entally was founded as an orphanage in 1845 but it is no longer an orphanage in the strict sense, although orphans continue to be looked after. Loreto Kilkenny has been twinned with Loreto Entally.

== Transport ==
=== Road ===
Many buses ply along Acharya Jagadish Chandra Bose Road, Dr. Lal Mohan Bhattacharya Road and CIT Road in Entally. Lenin Sarani and Surendranath Banerjee Road (S.N. Banerjee Road) connect this locality to Esplanade. Moulali is a 5 point junction in Entally connecting East Kolkata with Central Kolkata through Lenin Sarani, S N Banerjee Road and CIT Road (Sundari Mohan Avenue) and North Kolkata with South Kolkata through A J C Bose Road.

=== Train ===
Sealdah Station, one of biggest railway-terminals of Kolkata Metropolitan Area, is located nearby.

== Gallery ==
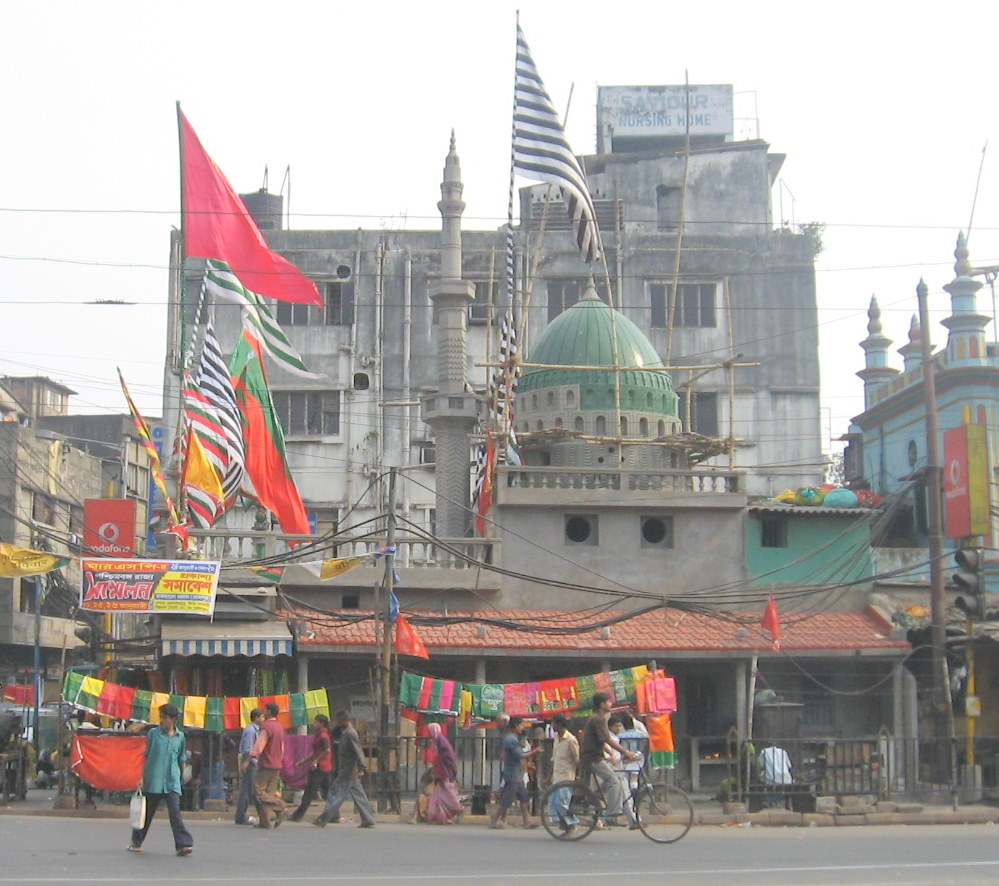
Moulali Dargah

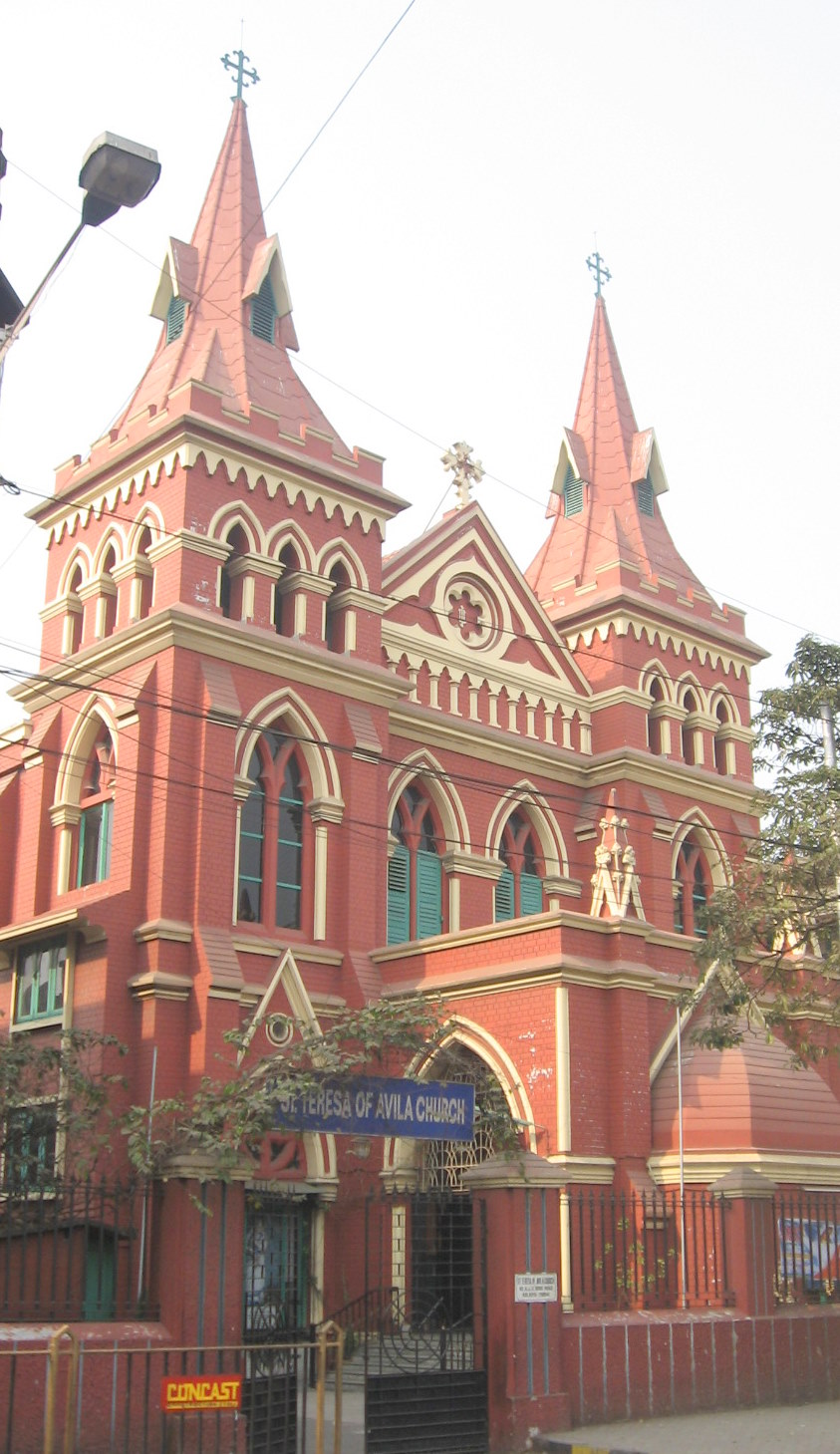
St. Teresa of Avila Church, Moulali

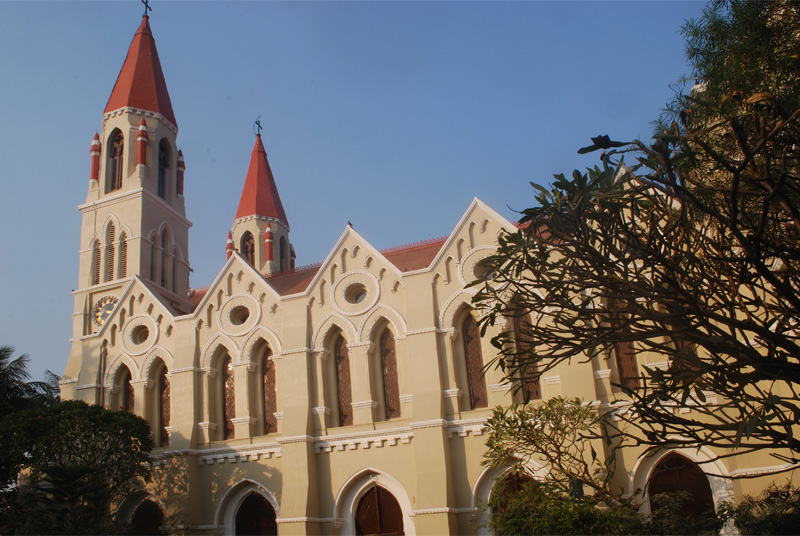
St. James' Church (Jora Girja)
