= Muchipara Assembly constituency =

Former constituency of the West Bengal Legislative Assembly, in India

Muchipara
- Former constituency for the West Bengal Legislative Assembly

Constituency details
- Country: India
- Region: East India
- State: West Bengal
- Lok Sabha constituency: Calcutta North East
- Established: 1952
- Abolished: 1967
- Reservation: None

Muchipara was a constituency of the West Bengal Legislative Assembly, in use during the 1952, 1957 and 1962 elections. It was one of the electoral districts of the state capital Calcutta. The Indian National Congress held the seat 1952–1957 and 1962–1967, whilst the Revolutionary Socialist Party held the seat 1957–1962. The constituency elected a single member of the West Bengal Legislative Assembly. It was part of the Calcutta North East Lok Sabha constituency.

== First assembly election ==
Muchipara was one of 26 legislative seats of Calcutta. The constituency was located in central Calcutta, covering sections of the old parts of the city. Muchipara (or 'Moochipara' during British rule) is Bengali for 'cobbler's colony', referring to the trade a group of Chamars living in the area. Moochipara had been a Hindu slum at the northern edge of Tiljala, a larger Muslim slum area.

The 1952 West Bengal Legislative Assembly election saw no less than sixteen candidates vying for the Muchipara seat. The main competition was between the Indian National Congress on one hand and the Communist Party of India-United Socialist Organisation left-wing alliance. The Congress Party fielded Sankar Prasad Mitra as its candidate, whilst the left-wing alliance fielded Forward Bloc (Marxist Group) candidate Dhirendra Chandra Bhowmick as its candidate. Mitra won the seat by a mere margin of nine votes.

== 1956 delimitation and demographics ==
The 1956 constituency delimitation drastically changed the boundaries of the Muchipara constituency. Two thirds of the pre-1956 constituency were transferred to the Vidyasagar constituency. Ward no. 43 was the only part of the pre-1956 constituency that remained in Muchipara after the delimitation exercise. After the 1956 delimitation the Muchipara constituency consisted of wards 30, 43 and 45.

In the post-1956 constituency, there were three main groups of 'Old Calcutta' families residing in the area – aristocratic families, members of the Suvarna Banik ('gold traders') sub-caste and members of the Gandha Banik ('spice traders') sub-caste. The Gandha Banik were concentrated in ward 30 whilst the Suvarna Banik dominated ward 45. Ward 43 was characterized by hosting a large red light district, with some 1,500 sex workers and their families living in the ward. There were also some presence of both Gandha Banik and Suvarna Banik families in ward 43.

Among the non-Bengali migrants to the city, there were some 4,000 Oriyas among the voters in the constituency and some 3,000 people from the Hindi belt (mainly Bihar).

Shopkeepers and shop employees represented a major share of the Muchipara voters, representing some 35–40% of the voters. Other residents included some Bengali middle class and working class voters. The constituency was largely Hindu, with just about a hundred Muslim voters.

== Elections after delimitation ==
Ahead of the 1957 West Bengal Legislative Assembly election, the Revolutionary Socialist Party had joined the CPI-led United Left Election Committee. The Congress Party fielded Pratap Chandra Chunder, a local resident of ward 45 and hailing from an influential family. Chunder's father Nirmal Chandra Chunder had been the mayor of Calcutta. The left combine fielded RSP trade union leader Jatin Chakraborty. Dhirendra Chandra Bhowmick, the left candidate from 1952, now ran as an independent.

Chakraborty won the election by a margin of 511 votes, dominating the vote in ward 30 and 43. Chunder was the most voted candidate in ward 45. During the 1957–1962 legislative period, Chakraborty had a high profile – being one of the most notable opposition politicians at the time. He actively engaged with the local communities in the Muchipara constituency. He maintained offices in each of the three wards, and attended these offices at fixed evening hours. He regularly visited social gatherings among his constituents. Chunder on the other hand strengthened his influence in the Suvarna Banik community during this period. In 1958 Chunder became the president of the Shanti Institute, a social welfare organisation of the Suvarna Banik community. Moreover, the Congress Party strengthened its organisational network in the area during this.

Chunder and Chakraborty again faced each other in the 1962 West Bengal Legislative Assembly election, without any third candidate in the fray. All the three Calcutta Municipal Corporation councilors of the wards of the Muchipara constituency had belonged to the left-wing alliance. But by the time of the 1962 election, the ward 43 left-wing councilor had joined the Congress Party and now campaigned for Chunder. Ward 30 had a Gandha Banik RSP councilor, who actively supported Chakraborty's campaign. Ward 45 had a Suvarna Banik CPI councilor, but he was contesting a neighbouring Legislative Assembly seat and thus had little time to spare to support Chakraborty's re-election effort.

Both candidate held meetings with constituents on nearly daily basis, and every week organized some two public rallies. Chakraborty's campaign highlighted cost of living issues, allegations of corruption and the Congress government legacy of police repression against popular movements (such as the 1959 Food Movement). Chunder sought to contextualize economic problems of Calcutta, and point to achievements of the First Five-Year plan. Chunder rebuffed accusations of corruption, including by reproducing speeches of Soviet leaders Nikita Khrushchev and Georgy Malenkov on corruption in the Soviet Union. The Congress Party campaign would also bring up the police firings on demonstrators in Left-ruled Kerala.

Chakraborty also raised issues like the Bengali language movement in Assam riots and protested plans for a transfer of the Berubari border area to Pakistan. The Congress Party campaign sought to emphasize the border conflict with China rather than the Pakistan border issue.

Chunder won the seat with a margin of 545 votes. Again Chakraborty had won the election in ward 30 and 43, and Chunder had won the election in ward 45. In ward 30 Chakraborty got 383 more votes than Chunder. There were tensions in the run-up to the vote, the left-wing claimed that on the eve of the election a group of campaign workers in ward 45 were kidnapped by the Congress Party (and released the next morning). The left-wing claimed the Congress Party influenced the election by padding voting rolls with fake voters.

Robi Chakravorti (1962) argues that one explanation of the shift to the Congress Party could be attributed to fatigue of shop owners and employees towards the agitational politics of the left-wing. The procession routes leading out of Calcutta University of the frequent left-wing mass rallies often bypassed the main streets of the Muchipara constituency, where many shops were located. Another factor would have been the sharp increase of Congress vote among the Oriya voters, influenced by the popularity of the new, relatively young Congress Party Orissa Chief Minister Biju Patnaik. In 1957 Oriya voters had been skeptical of the Congress Party following pro-Bihar merger agitations in Saraikela and Kharsawan.

== Election results ==
=== 1952 West Bengal Legislative Assembly election ===
West Bengal assembly elections, 1952: Muchipara constituency
| Party | Candidate | Votes | % | ±% |
|---|---|---|---|---|
| INC | Sankar Prasad Mitra | 6,577 | 33.24% | |
| AIFB | Dhirendra Chandra Bhowmick | 6,568 | 33.20% | |
| Independent | Arobinda Bose | 1,989 | 10.05% | |
| ABHM | Sanat Kumar Roy Chowdhury | 1,834 | 9.27% | |
| Independent | Panna Lal Mitra | 643 | 3.25% | |
| RSP | Prabir Chandra Ghose | 428 | 2.16% | |
| Independent | Abul Ahsan | 412 | 2.08% | |
| Independent | Jatindra Biswas | 337 | 1.70% | |
| KMPP | Santi Sen Gupta | 335 | 1.69% | |
| Independent | Jogesh Nath Maitra | 219 | 1.11% | |
| Independent | Nikhilesh Sen Gupta | 179 | 0.90% | |
| Independent | Promode Kumar Ghosal | 72 | 0.36% | |
| Independent | Narendra Nath Banerjee | 54 | 0.27% | |
| Socialist Party (India) | Abaniswar Misra | 53 | 0.27% | |
| Independent | Bhupendra Ghose | 50 | 0.25% | |
| Independent | Mahendra Kumar Ghose | 34 | 0.17% | |
| Turnout | | 19,784 | 38.55% | |
| INC win (new seat) | | | | |

=== 1957 West Bengal Legislative Assembly election ===
West Bengal assembly elections, 1957: Muchipara constituency
| Party | Candidate | Votes | % | ±% |
|---|---|---|---|---|
| RSP | Jatin Chakraborty | 15,251 | 50.27% | +48.11 |
| INC | Pratap Chandra Chunder | 14,740 | 48.59% | +15.35 |
| Independent | Dhirendra Chandra Bhowmick | 347 | 1.14% | |
| Turnout | | 30,338 | 56.97% | +18.42 |
| RSP gain from INC | | Swing | | |

=== 1962 West Bengal Legislative Assembly election ===
West Bengal assembly elections, 1962: Muchipara constituency
| Party | Candidate | Votes | % | ±% |
|---|---|---|---|---|
| INC | Pratap Chandra Chunder | 18,686 | 50.74% | +2.15 |
| RSP | Jatin Chakraborty | 18,141 | 49.26% | −1.01 |
| Turnout | | 36,827 | 70.12% | +13.15 |
| INC gain from RSP | | Swing | | |
