= Pratap Chandra Chunder =

Indian politician (1919–2008)

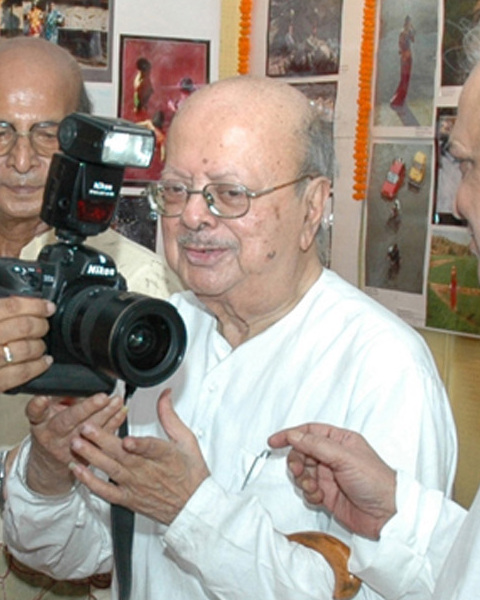
- Chunder in 2006.

Union Minister of Education
- In office 24 March 1977 – 28 July 1979
- Prime Minister: Morarji Desai
- Preceded by: Saiyid Nurul Hasan
- Succeeded by: Karan Singh

Union Minister of Social Welfare
- In office 26 March 1977 – 28 July 1979
- Prime Minister: Morarji Desai
- Preceded by: Saiyid Nurul Hasan
- Succeeded by: Sathiavani Muthu

Member of Parliament, Lok Sabha
- In office 1977–1980
- Preceded by: Hirendranath Mukherjee
- Succeeded by: Sunil Maitra
- Constituency: Calcutta North East

Member of West Bengal Legislative Assembly
- In office 1962–1967
- Preceded by: Jatindra Chandra Chakraborty
- Succeeded by: Constituency abolished
- Constituency: Muchipara
- In office 1967–1968
- Preceded by: Constituency established
- Succeeded by: Jatindra Chandra Chakraborty
- Constituency: Sealdah

Personal details
- Born: 1 September 1919 Calcutta, Bengal Presidency, British India
- Died: 1 January 2008 (aged 88) Kolkata, West Bengal, India
- Party: Janata Dal
- Other political affiliations: Janata Party; Indian National Congress
- Spouse: Leena Chunder
- Children: 4
- Education: B.A (hons) in history Presidency College; LLB; Calcutta University; D. Phil; Calcutta University

Pratap Chandra Chunder (1 September 1919 – 1 January 2008) (Bengali: প্রতাপচন্দ্র চন্দ্র) was a union minister of India, educationist and author. He served in the Morarji Desai Ministry as a cabinet minister with education and social welfare portfolios.

== Family and education ==
Chunder was the son of Nirmal Chandra Chunder, a prominent member of the Indian National Congress who was a close associate of Chittaranjan Das, a labour union leader & had also served as a Member of the Bengal Legislative Assembly (1925–30) & the Mayor of Calcutta Municipal Corporation (May 1952 to March 1953) . Both his father & grandfather Ganesh Chandra Chunder were renowned lawyers of the city. He completed his BA (Hons.) in history at Presidency College, Calcutta, ranking first class first, and his LLB at the University of Calcutta. He was awarded a D Phil in Arts from the same university.

== Career ==
From an early age Chunder joined the Congress Party and became a member of the West Bengal Legislative Assembly from 1962 till 1968. He was briefly the Finance and Judicial Minister of West Bengal in 1968 under Prafulla Chandra Ghosh. From 1977 to 1979 he was the Education and Social Welfare Minister of India, having been elected from Calcutta North East constituency a Janata Party candidate, defeating the sitting 5 - time MP Hirendranath Mukherjee of CPI. He lost his seat in 1980 to CPI(M)'s Sunil Maitra, in which he came third. Chunder stood as the Janata Dal candidate in 1991 general elections in which he came second & failed to defeat incumbent Ajit Kumar Panja of INC(I)

Chunder was an attorney-at-law at the Calcutta High Court and an advocate of the Supreme Court of India. He was member of Senate and the faculty of law of the Calcutta University between 1961 and 1968.

Chunder was the Founder-Chairman of West Bengal Heritage Commission and the President of the Board of Governors of IISWBM, India's first MBA school. From 2000 to 2005 he was a member of the executive council of the Rabindra Bharati University. Chunder was the President of the Presidency College Alumni Association from 1989–90 to 1993-94 and again during 1998–99.

Pratap Chandra Chunder died of cardiovascular disease on 1 January 2008, aged 88.

In its obituary, the Telegraph noted

Pratap Chandra Chunder’s aristocratic class origins, which once gave him an edge in Bengal’s politics, became a liability when the nature of politics changed. He belonged to — and represented — an era in politics when educated people from the rich and the leisurely classes made natural political leaders. Gandhian politics and the Congress, too, were their natural choices. But mass politics became too hot for such gentlemen politicians, especially after the rise of the CPI(M) and the stormy days of Naxalite violence. The rough and tumble of electoral politics was something that leaders like Chunder were not trained in. They had neither the temperament for it nor an ability to survive and thrive in it.....But Chunder remained true to his old-world values of non-violence, honesty and integrity in public life, while knowing that success in today’s politics had little to do with these values.

== Publications ==
Chunder authored many historical novels and dramas. They are:

- Bubhuksha
- Smrtira Alinde
- Job Charnocker Bibi
- Glimpses of Indian Culture: Ancient and Modern
- Kautilya on Love and Morals
