= Sealdah (disambiguation) =

Sealdah may refer to:

- Sealdah, a neighbourhood of central Kolkata, India
- Sealdah railway division, serving 5 districts of West Bengal
- Sealdah railway station, a major railway station in Kolkata, West Bengal, India
- Sealdah (Vidhan Sabha constituency), an assembly constituency in West Bengal, India
