= Jatin Chakraborty =

Indian politician, trade unionist (1911–1996)

Jatin Chakraborty at a 1992 protest against transfer of the Tin Bigha Corridor to Bangladesh

Jatindra Chandra Chakraborty (1911 – 1996) was an Indian politician and trade unionist. Chakraborty played a prominent role in West Bengal politics and was often entangled in controversies. He was a founding leader of the Revolutionary Socialist Party and the United Trade Union Congress. Chakraborty was a member of the West Bengal Legislative Assembly from 1957 to 1962, 1969 to 1970 and 1977 to 1991. He served in ministerial posts in the state governments of the United Front (1969) and the Left Front (1977–1988). After falling out with the Left Front in 1988, Chakraborty became a vocal critic of the state government.

== Youth ==
Jatindra Chandra Chakraborty was born on 10 September 1911 in Comilla. He was the son of Surendra Chandra Chakraborty. He attended the Hare School in Calcutta and would later study at the Scottish Church College, Ripon College and Vidyasagar College. During his student years, he became politically active, being associated with the revolutionary Anushilan Samiti. As a college student, he was a leader of the All-Bengal Students' Association, an organisation banned by the British colonial authorities, and a member of the Students' Radical Party. He was imprisoned by the British authorities in 1932, after being arrested during the non-cooperation movement. Chakraborty obtained Bachelor of Arts and Bachelor of Laws degrees from Calcutta University. Chakraborty was a founding member of the Revolutionary Socialist Party (RSP) in 1940. He was again imprisoned by the British authorities in 1942 during the Quit India movement.

== Labour leader ==
Chakraborty was a leader of the All India Trade Union Congress and served as secretary of the Bengal Provincial Trade Union Congress. In 1949, Chakraborty, K.T. Shahand, and Mrinal Kanti Bose founded the United Trade Union Congress (UTUC).

RSP fielded Chakraborty as its candidate in the Belgachia seat in the 1952 West Bengal Legislative Assembly election. Chakraborty finished in seventh place with 571 votes (2.64%)

Chakraborty was part of a small group of RSP Central Committee members who dominated the party leadership after the departure of the ageing Jogesh Chandra Chatterjee from the helm of the organisation. Chakraborty was the foremost trade union leader and organiser of the RSP in West Bengal. Between 1947 and 1962, Chakraborty was arrested 13 times in connection with different agitations, such as the January 1956 struggle against the Bihar-Bengal merger and the July 1960 central government employees' strike. In 1952, Chakraborty was part of a UTUC delegation visiting China for May Day. In 1953, he took part in a study visit to trade unions in the United Kingdom under the Colombo Plan, and in 1954, he was a delegate to the World Federation of Trade Unions congress held in the Soviet Union.

== Legislator ==
Chakraborty contested the Muchipara seat in the 1957 West Bengal Legislative Assembly election. Muchipara was a constituency located in three central Calcutta wards (wards number 30, 43 and 45). This time, RSP was part of a Communist Party of India-led left coalition. Chakraborty won the seat, obtaining 15,251 votes (50.27%). He won by a margin of 511 votes. His support was concentrated in wards 30 and 43, the latter characterized by housing a large red light district. During his tenure as a legislator, he actively sought to maintain links with his constituents, often visiting homes and attending social gatherings in the area. He kept offices in each ward and regularly attended these offices at fixed evening hours. Chakraborty had a high profile as a legislator; his actions in the legislature were often reported in Calcutta newspapers. Per a prominent Congress politician he was second among opposition politicians only to the communist Leader of the Opposition Jyoti Basu.

After the death of UTUC general secretary M.K. Bose in 1957, the Bolshevik Party of India leader Sisir Roy became the new UTUC general secretary. However, according to Harold Crouch (1966), the real power within UTUC lay with Chakraborty. Chakraborty was one of the secretaries of UTUC. Chakraborty became a member of the Governing Body of the National Productivity Council when it was founded in 1957. In 1961, Chakraborty visited Czechoslovakia as a member of a National Productivity Council delegation.

Chakraborty lost the Muchipara seat in the 1962 West Bengal Legislative Assembly election, finishing in second place with 18,141 votes (49.26%). He lost the seat to Congress candidate Pratap Chandra Chunder, who won by a margin of 545 votes. Chakraborty remained the most voted candidate in wards 30 and 43, but the increase in Congress vote in ward 45 shifted the balance in Chunder's favour.

== United Front ==
Chakraborty was a member of the West Bengal Legislative Council during the 1960s. Chakraborty and other UTUC leaders played an important role in shaping left unity for the 1967 West Bengal Legislative Assembly election. In the 1969 West Bengal Legislative Assembly election, Chakraborty won the Sealdah seat. He obtained 27,797 votes (55.32%). Chakraborty became one of two RSP ministers in the United Front state government formed after the 1969 election. He held the post of Minister for Parliamentary Affairs and served as the Chief Whip in the West Bengal Legislative Assembly since February 1969. He attended the seventh congress of the World Federation of Trade Unions, held in Budapest in 1969. He also visited East Germany, where he was received by the Free German Trade Union Federation.

== 1971 and 1972 elections ==
In the 1971 West Bengal Legislative Assembly election, Chakraborty contested the Balurghat seat instead. He finished in second place with 22,941 votes (42.11%). In the 1972 West Bengal Legislative Assembly election, RSP fielded him in the Dhakuria seat, finishing in second place with 20,550 votes (38.63%). During the election campaign, he survived an assassination attempt, as a bomb exploded on 27 February 1972.

== Left Front minister ==
Chakraborty won the Dhakuria seat in the 1977 West Bengal Legislative Assembly election, obtaining 32,029 votes (48.92%). He was appointed Minister-in-Charge of the Public Works Department (excluding the Metropolitan Development Branch) and the Department of Housing in the first Left Front state government. In the midst of the post-electoral frenzy, the incoming minister, Chakraborty, had the dome of the Shaheed Minar monument painted red. The move proved unpopular in the city, and Chakraborty was forced undo the colour change of the monument.

He retained the Dhakuria seat in the 1982 West Bengal Legislative Assembly election, obtaining 51,151 votes (60.60%). He retained his ministerial portfolios in the second Left Front government.

In mid-1983, Chakraborty was embroiled in a dispute with pop singer Usha Uthup. The controversy lasted for about two months. Chakraborty decried Uthup's performances as "apasanskriti" (decadent). Chakraborty publicly argued that he wanted to protect Bengali society from "cheap, disco, perverted culture". Chakraborty declared that Uthup would be stopped from performing in state-run auditoriums. Chakraborty and RSP workers disrupted Uthup's shows. Uthup sued Chakraborty for defamation because of his comments against her. A Calcutta High Court judge ruled in favour of Uthup.

He again won the Dhakuria seat in the 1987 West Bengal Legislative Assembly election, with 53,361 votes (53.10%). Chakraborty retained his role as Minister of the Public Works Department in the third Left Front state government formed after the 1987 election.

== Bengal Lamps controversy ==
In 1988, Chakraborty was at the centre of a major political controversy, which almost brought down the state government. On 18 September 1988, the Bengali daily Ananda Bazar Patrika published a note attributed to Chakraborty, which alleged that he had received instructions from the Chief Minister Jyoti Basu to favour the Jadavpur based loss-making firm Bengal Lamps company (where Jyoti Basu's son Chandan was employed at that time) with bulk orders from the Public Works Department. At the time, it was widely believed that Chakraborty himself had leaked the note. Political commentators speculated that recent decisions to remove the State Housing Board from his responsibilities and to hand over road construction to the Public Works Department and the Zilla Parishads could have provoked Chakraborty to leak the note. Another explanation, circulating at the time, was that Chakraborty had leaked the note upon orders from the RSP, in the wake of a low point in RSP-CPI(M) relations after violence committed by CPI(M) cadres against the members of other Left Front parties in the lead up to the 1988 panchayat elections. In the run-up to the panchayat elections, Chakraborty had called Basu "arrogant and haughty" in a speech at a rally, and had apologize soon thereafter. Other commentators speculated that the note might have originated from the bureaucracy and was linked to disputes among bureaucrats. The CPI(M) accused Chakraborty of fabricating a false accusation against Basu and asked him to apologize, admit the note was false, and resign from his ministerial post. Chakraborty refused to back down. Initially, RSP supported Chakraborty, and it appeared that the Left Front was heading towards a break-up. Eventually, the crisis was averted as RSP changed position and asked Chakraborty to resign. Chakraborty resigned from his ministerial post on 28 October 1988. Chakraborty was expelled from RSP.

== In the political wilderness ==
Chakraborty's departure from the party diminished the RSP's clout. After the rupture with the Left Front, he emerged as a vocal critic of the government. Around 1991, he tried to mobilise Left Front dissidents into a "third front" ahead of the upcoming elections, and garnered a degree of support in Calcutta. He would describe the first 5–7 years of Left Front governance as a positive experience, but that in later years, 'decay crept in'. In particular, Chakraborty criticized the economic policies of the Left Front government. He publicly criticized the installation of a statue of Ho Chi Minh, instead calling for a Jayaprakash Narayan statue to be raised at the same spot. Gorkha National Liberation Front leader Subhash Ghising invited Chakraborty to Darjeeling to discuss support for autonomy for the Gorkha Hills.

He contested the 1991 West Bengal Legislative Assembly election with Congress(I) support. Chakraborty ran as an independent candidate in the Dhakuria seat, finishing in second place with 40,426 votes (34.14%) and losing the seat to the RSP candidate Kshiti Goswami. Chakraborty died in August 1996.

== Legacy ==
Popularly known as "Jakie Da", Chakraborty played a major role in West Bengal politics. A controversial figure, he was described variably as "sharp-tongued, witty, vigorous, courageous - but somewhat lacking in decorum", "a man of colourful personality" and "ebullient". In 1988, The Illustrated Weekly of India stated that Chakraborty had an "uncanny ability to spout utterances which embroil him in needless, unsavoury controversies". In 1966, the Economic and Political Weekly commentator Flibbertigibbet stated that "Jatin Chakraborty has never been known to be an easy person to accommodate in any alliance". He was known to be a cigar smoker.
