= West Bengal Students' Union =

Student wing of Indian National Congress

West Bengal Chhatra Parishad (CP)
- (West Bengal wing of the National Students Union of India)
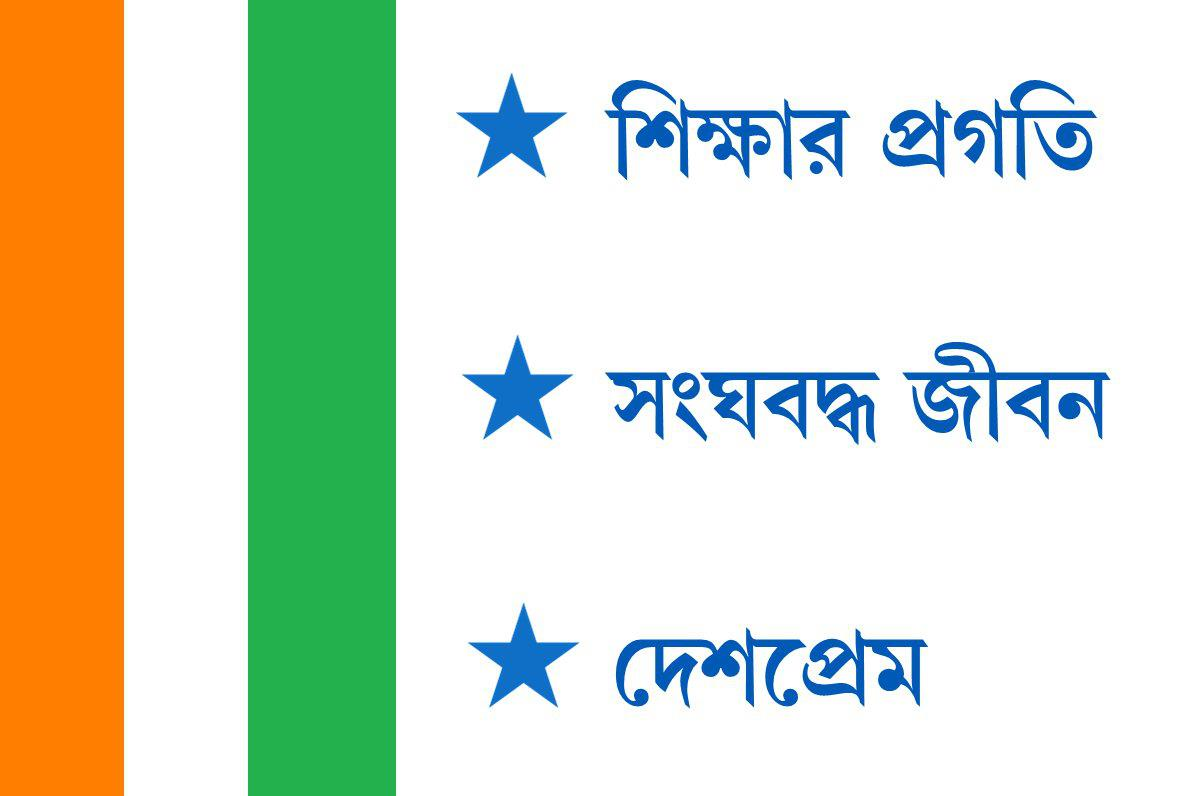
- Abbreviation: CP
- Formation: 28 August 1954
- Founder: Atulya Ghosh; Bidhan Chandra Roy
- Type: Student Organization
- Legal status: Active
- Headquarters: 104E, Dr Lal Mohan Bhattacharya Rd, Sealdah, Entally, Kolkata, West Bengal 700014
- Location: West Bengal
- President: Priyanka Choudhury
- Parent organization: NSUI
- Affiliations: Indian National Congress; West Bengal Pradesh Congress Committee
- Website: http://chhatraparishad.org/

Chhatra Parishad, popularly known as "CP", is the student wing of Indian National Congress, a major political party of India. It is the West Bengal wing of National Students Union of India (NSUI)

CP is one of the major student organizations in West Bengal, where it has won student union election in many colleges.

== About the Chhatra Parishad ==
West Bengal Chhatra Parishad (also known as Chhatra Parishad and West Bengal State Chhatra Parishad and abbreviated as CP) affiliated to NSUI is the students wing of Indian National Congress in the state of West Bengal. It was formed on 28 August 1954 in Kolkata under the guidance of Atulya Ghosh and Bidhan Chandra Ray.

Chhatra Parishad is one of the main student organization in West Bengal. CP proposes the idea of student activism based on progressive thought, secular vision and democratic action.

== Flag ==
A flag with a tri-colour (saffron, white and green) horizontally in the left corner, on a white background and "শিক্ষার প্রগতি" (Advancement of Learning), "সংঘবদ্ধ জীবন" (Organised Life) and "দেশপ্রেম" (Patriotism) written one beneath the other in blue; the ratio of length and breadth of the flag being 3:2.

== Student leaders ==
- Bidhu Bhusan Ghosh
- Shyamal Bhattacharya
- Indu Bhusan Adhikary
- Priya Ranjan Dasmunsi
- Subrata Mukherjee
- Kumud Bhattacharya
- Jayanta Bhattacharya
- Ashok Kumar Deb
- Bibhas Chowdhury
- Subhankar Sarkar
- Sourav Chakraborty
- Rahul Ray
- Ashutosh Chatterjee
- Sourav Prasad
- Priyanka Choudhury
