= Sunil Maitra =

Indian politician

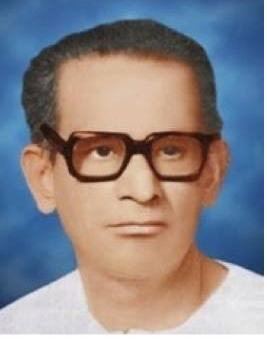

Member of Parliament, Lok Sabha
- In office 1980–1984
- Preceded by: Pratap Chandra Chunder
- Succeeded by: Ajit Kumar Panja
- Constituency: Calcutta North East

Personal details
- Born: 1 February 1927 Chittagong, East Bengal
- Died: 18 September 1996 (aged 69) Kolkata
- Party: Communist Party of India (Marxist)
- Education: University of Calcutta
- Profession: Politician, social worker

Sunil Maitra (1 February 1927 – 18 September 1996), born at Chittagong in Bangladesh, was a member of the 7th Lok Sabha of India. He represented the Calcutta North East constituency of West Bengal as a member of the Communist Party of India (Marxist) party. Maitra was also among the leadership of the All India Insurance Employees Association. He was a member of the Politburo of the party from 9 January 1992 till his death.
