= Calcutta North East Lok Sabha constituency =

Former Constituency of the Indian parliament in West Bengal

Coordinates: 22°34′22″N 88°21′50″E

Calcutta North East
- Former Lok Sabha constituency

Constituency details
- Country: India
- Region: East India
- State: West Bengal
- Assembly constituencies: As of 2004: Entally; Beliaghata; Sealdah; Vidyasagar; Burtola; Maniktola; Belgachia West
- Established: 1951
- Abolished: 2009
- Reservation: None

Calcutta North East Lok Sabha constituency was one of the 543 parliamentary constituencies in India. The constituency centred on North East area of Kolkata in West Bengal. As a consequence of the order of the Delimitation Commission in respect of the delimitation of constituencies in the West Bengal, this parliamentary constituency ceased to exist from 2009.

== Assembly segments ==
Calcutta North East Lok Sabha constituency was composed of the following assembly segments:

- Entally (assembly constituency no. 153)
- Beliaghata (assembly constituency no. 155)
- Sealdah (assembly constituency no. 156)
- Vidyasagar (assembly constituency no. 157)
- Burtola (assembly constituency no. 158)
- Maniktola (assembly constituency no. 159)
- Belgachia West (assembly constituency no. 160)

== Members of Parliament ==
| Election | Member | Party |
|---|---|---|
| 1952 | Meghnad Saha | Revolutionary Socialist Party |
| 1956^ | Mohit Mitra | Communist Party of India |
| 1957 | Hirendranath Mukherjee | Communist Party of India |
| 1962 | Hirendranath Mukherjee | Communist Party of India |
| 1967 | Hirendranath Mukherjee | Communist Party of India |
| 1971 | Hirendranath Mukherjee | Communist Party of India |
| 1977 | Pratap Chandra Chunder | Janata Party |
| 1980 | Sunil Maitra | Communist Party of India (Marxist) |
| 1984 | Ajit Kumar Panja | Indian National Congress |
| 1989 | Ajit Kumar Panja | Indian National Congress |
| 1991 | Ajit Kumar Panja | Indian National Congress |
| 1996 | Ajit Kumar Panja | Indian National Congress |
| 1998 | Ajit Kumar Panja | Trinamool Congress |
| 1999 | Ajit Kumar Panja | Trinamool Congress |
| 2004 | Mohammed Salim | Communist Party of India (Marxist) |

^By poll

== Election results ==
=== General election 2004 ===
2004 Indian general election: Calcutta North East
| Party | Candidate | Votes | % | ±% |
|---|---|---|---|---|
| CPI(M) | Mohammed Salim | 284,427 | 49.90 | |
| AITC | Ajit Kumar Panja | 210,647 | 37.10 | |
| INC | Indira Mukherjee | 56,449 | 9.09 | |
| Independent | Ajit Kumar Panja | 4,792 | 3.05 | |
| Independent | Pintu Kundu | 4,180 | 7.09 | |
| Independent | Debojyoti Basu | 2,625 | 7.09 | |
| BSP | Chandra Prakash Dubey | 2,226 | 7.09 | |
| Independent | Mahua Roy | 1,311 | 7.09 | |
| Independent | Angshuman Paul | 1,308 | 7.09 | |
| Independent | Imtiaz Ahmed | 918 | 7.09 | |
| Margin of victory | | 73,780 | 10.0 | |
| Turnout | | 5,68,885 | 81.24 | |
| CPI(M) gain from AITC | | Swing | | |

=== General election 1999 ===
1999 Indian general election: Calcutta North East
| Party | Candidate | Votes | % | ±% |
|---|---|---|---|---|
| AITC | Ajit Kumar Panja | 297,491 | 45.17 | |
| CPI(M) | Mohammed Salim | 255,917 | 38.86 | |
| INC | Tapas Roy | 84,516 | 12.83 | |
| Independent | Sukhen Dolui | 5,282 | 0.80 | |
| BSP | Bali Karan Kori | 4,448 | 7.09 | 0.68 |
| Independent | Mohammed Salim | 3,893 | 0.59 | |
| SP | Md. Ghaus Ali | 3,267 | 0.50 | |
| Independent | Ashim Kumar Saha | 2,143 | 0.33 | |
| Independent | Samar Das | 1,674 | 0.25 | |
| Margin of victory | | 41,574 | (6.3%) | |
| Turnout | | 8,05,121 | 66.96 | |
| AITC hold | | Swing | | |

=== General election 1998 ===
1998 Indian general election: Calcutta North East
| Party | Candidate | Votes | % | ±% |
|---|---|---|---|---|
| AITC | Ajit Kumar Panja | 310,361 | 47.10% | |
| CPI(M) | Prasanta Chatterjee | 245,489 | 37.26% | |
| INC | Sadhan Pandey | 94,024 | 14.27% | |
| Independent | Ajit Das | 1,986 | 0.30% | |
| Independent | Sharad Kumar Singh | 1,725 | 0.26% | 0.68 |
| Independent | Feroz Ahmed | 1,368 | 0.21% | |
| Independent | Swapan Sarkar | 1,278 | 0.19% | |
| Independent | Brij Bhusan Sharma | 925 | 0.14% | |
| Independent | Anjali Rakshit | 769 | 0.12% | |
| Independent | Tarapada Halder | 572 | 0.09% | |
| Independent | Md. Shahid Iqbal | 435 | 0.07% | |
| Margin of victory | | 64,872 | (9.7%) | |
| Turnout | | 6,58,932 | 73.45% | |
| AITC gain from INC | | Swing | | |

=== General election 1996 ===
1996 Indian general election: Calcutta North East
| Party | Candidate | Votes | % | ±% |
|---|---|---|---|---|
| INC | Ajit Kumar Panja | 335,855 | 51.98% | |
| CPI(M) | Dipen Ghosh | 270,870 | 41.93% | |
| BJP | Subhas Maitra | 33,246 | 5.15% | |
| Independent | Tapan Kumar Sarkar | 2,094 | 0.32% | |
| Independent | Hari Narayan Ray | 998 | 0.15% | |
| AIIC(T) | Salil Kumar Tiwari | 616 | 0.10% | |
| Independent | Uday Pratap Singh | 611 | 0.09% | |
| Independent | Subhas Dhar | 541 | 0.08% | |
| Independent | Radheshyam Yadav | 429 | 0.07% | |
| Independent | Jayanta Bhowmick | 292 | 0.05% | |
| Independent | Mohanlal Agarwal | 278 | 0.04% | |
| Independent | Achintya Jana | 235 | 0.04% | |
| Margin of victory | | 64,985 | (9.8%) | |
| Turnout | | 6,46,065 | 72.79% | |
| INC hold | | Swing | | |

=== General election 1991 ===
1991 Indian general election: Calcutta North East
| Party | Candidate | Votes | % | ±% |
|---|---|---|---|---|
| INC | Ajit Kumar Panja | 276,399 | 49.52% | |
| JD | Pratap Chandra Chunder | 204,943 | 36.72% | |
| BJP | Dibakar Kundu | 55,064 | 9.87% | |
| JP | Hrishikesh Dubey | 7,360 | 1.32% | |
| Independent | Sukumar Biswas | 5,074 | 0.91% | |
| ABJS | Anima Basu | 3,624 | 0.65% | |
| Independent | Anath Baran Bhowal | 1,792 | 0.32% | |
| Independent | Ajit Chowdhury | 1,050 | 0.19% | |
| Independent | Madhav Upadhyay | 653 | 0.12% | |
| Independent | Barun Goswami | 489 | 0.09% | |
| Independent | Gopichand Prasad | 487 | 0.09% | |
| SS | Hijal Prakash Chatterjee | 455 | 0.08% | |
| Doordarshi Party | Chhedi Lal Jalan | 274 | 0.05% | |
| Independent | Tapan Kumar Sarkar | 269 | 0.05% | |
| Independent | Achintya Jana | 188 | 0.03% | |
| Margin of victory | | 71,456 | (12.5%) | |
| Turnout | | 5,58,121 | 66.82% | |
| INC hold | | Swing | | |

=== General election 1989 ===
1989 Indian general election: Calcutta North East
| Party | Candidate | Votes | % | ±% |
|---|---|---|---|---|
| INC | Ajit Kumar Panja | 305,237 | 51.59% | |
| CPI(M) | Satyasadhan Chakraborty | 277,608 | 46.92% | |
| BJP | Sibu Chakraborty | 2,572 | 0.43% | |
| JP | Pradip Guha Roy | 1,220 | 0.21% | |
| Independent | Sudhindra Chandra | 1,154 | 0.20% | |
| ABJS | Sukumar Biswas | 1,076 | 0.18% | |
| Independent | Harizan Santal | 930 | 0.16% | |
| Independent | Ajit Ghosh | 909 | 0.15% | |
| Independent | Tapan Kumar Sarkar | 529 | 0.09% | |
| Independent | Achinta Jana | 421 | 0.07% | |
| Margin of victory | | 27,629 | (4.6%) | |
| Turnout | | 5,91,656 | 72.71% | |
| INC hold | | Swing | | |

=== General election 1984 ===
1984 Indian general election: Calcutta North East
| Party | Candidate | Votes | % | ±% |
|---|---|---|---|---|
| INC | Ajit Kumar Panja | 284,324 | 57.11% | |
| CPI(M) | Sunil Maitra | 195,748 | 39.32% | |
| JP | Nirmalendu Dey | 5,488 | 1.10% | |
| IUML | Mohammed Samsuddin | 3,591 | 0.72% | |
| Independent | Kanailal Choudhury | 2,085 | 0.42% | |
| ABJS | Amalendu Roy | 1,623 | 0.33% | |
| Independent | Rajesh Gupta | 1,155 | 0.23% | |
| Independent | Rabindranath Dasgupta | 1,088 | 0.22% | |
| Independent | Kanailal Bose | 760 | 0.15% | |
| Independent | Nilima Nandy | 738 | 0.15% | |
| Independent | Dhirendranath Chatterjee | 690 | 0.14% | |
| Independent | Rabin Mukherjee | 586 | 0.12% | |
| Margin of victory | | 88,576 | (17.4%) | |
| Turnout | | 4,97,876 | 71.75% | |
| INC gain from CPI(M) | | Swing | | |

=== General election 1980 ===
1980 Indian general election: Calcutta North East
| Party | Candidate | Votes | % | ±% |
|---|---|---|---|---|
| CPI(M) | Sunil Maitra | 187,952 | 47.95% | |
| INC(I) | Ajit Kumar Panja | 160,882 | 41.05% | |
| JP | Pratap Chandra Chunder | 32,832 | 8.38% | |
| INC(U) | Sudip Bandyopadhyay | 5,142 | 1.31% | |
| Independent | Mubarak Mazdoor | 879 | 0.22% | |
| ABJS | Ritendra Nath Ghosh | 856 | 0.22% | |
| Independent | Md. Nasim Ali Azad | 817 | 0.21% | |
| Independent | Sk. Noyimuddin | 745 | 0.19% | |
| Independent | Rameshwar Agarwal | 728 | 0.19% | |
| Independent | Panchanan Mondal | 615 | 0.16% | |
| Independent | Karuna Nidhan Roy | 518 | 0.13% | |
| Margin of victory | | 27,069 | (6.8%) | |
| Turnout | | 3,91,964 | 55.04% | |
| CPI(M) gain from BLD | | Swing | | |

=== General election 1977 ===
1977 Indian general election: Calcutta North East
| Party | Candidate | Votes | % | ±% |
|---|---|---|---|---|
| BLD | Pratap Chandra Chunder | 237,787 | 67.53% | |
| CPI | Hirendranath Mukherjee | 108,028 | 30.68% | |
| Independent | Rizawan Ahmed | 4,392 | 1.25% | |
| Independent | Arun Kumar De | 1,934 | 0.55% | |
| Margin of victory | | 1,29,759 | | |
| Turnout | | 3,52,141 | 56.29% | |
| BLD gain from CPI | | Swing | | |

=== General election 1971 ===
1971 Indian general election: Calcutta North East
| Party | Candidate | Votes | % | ±% |
|---|---|---|---|---|
| CPI | Hirendranath Mukherjee | 113,230 | 40.34 | |
| CPI(M) | Piyus Kanti Dasgupta | 110,939 | 39.53 | |
| INC(O) | Balai Chandra Paul | 56,490 | 20.13 | |
| Margin of victory | | 2,309 | | |
| Turnout | | 2,80,659 | 54.27% | |
| CPI hold | | Swing | | |

=== General election 1967 ===
1967 Indian general election: Calcutta North East
| Party | Candidate | Votes | % | ±% |
|---|---|---|---|---|
| CPI | Hirendranath Mukherjee | 130,600 | 37.83 | |
| INC | Balai Chandra Pal | 116,457 | 33.73 | |
| CPI(M) | Amalendu Bhushan Chakraborty | 98,193 | 28.44 | |
| Margin of victory | | 14,153 | | |
| Turnout | | 3,45,250 | 64.53 | |
| CPI hold | | Swing | | |

=== General election 1962 ===
1962 Indian general election: Calcutta Central
| Party | Candidate | Votes | % | ±% |
|---|---|---|---|---|
| CPI | Hirendranath Mukherjee | 154,772 | 58.22 | |
| INC | Balai Chandra Paul | 111,082 | 41.78 | |
| Margin of victory | | 43,692 | | |
| Turnout | | 2,65,854 | 66.84% | |
| CPI hold | | Swing | | |

=== General election 1957 ===
1957 Indian general election: Calcutta Central
| Party | Candidate | Votes | % | ±% |
|---|---|---|---|---|
| CPI | Hirendranath Mukherjee | 135,308 | 65.04 | |
| INC | Nalinikrishna Sanyal | 68,403 | 32.88 | |
| Independent | Satish Chandra Roy | 4,227 | 2.08 | |
| Margin of victory | | 76,905 | | |
| Turnout | | 2,08,047 | 52.57 | |
| CPI hold | | Swing | | |

=== General election 1952 ===
1952 Indian general election: Calcutta North East
| Party | Candidate | Votes | % | ±% |
|---|---|---|---|---|
| CPI | Hirendranath Mukherjee | 71,970 | 50.28% | |
| INC | Bejoy Bihari Mukherjee | 36,180 | 25.28% | |
| ABHM | Debendra Nath Mukherjee | 14,505 | 10.13% | |
| RSP | Tarapada Lahiri | 5,801 | 4.05% | |
| Independent | Pramatha Nath Banerjee | 4,809 | 3.36% | |
| Independent | Jiban Lal Chatterjee | 3,625 | 2.53% | |
| Independent | Paresh Chandra Chatterjee | 2,519 | 1.76% | |
| Independent | Kedar Nath Chatterjee | 2,403 | 1.68% | |
| Independent | Manmohan Bhattacharjee | 1,320 | 0.92% | |
| Margin of victory | | 35,790 | | |
| Turnout | | 1,43,132 | 38.12 | |
| CPI win (new seat) | | | | |

=== General elections 1977-2004 ===
Most of the contests were multi-cornered. However, only winners and runners-up are mentioned below:

| Year | Winner | | Runner-up | |
| | Candidate | Party | Candidate | Party |
| 1951 | Hirendra Nath Mukherjee | Communist Party of India | Bejoy Behari Mukherjee | Indian National Congress |
| 1957 | Hirendranath Mukherjee | Communist Party of India | Nalinakshya Sanyal | Indian National Congress |
| 1962 | Hirendra Nath Mukherjee | Communist Party of India | Balai Chandra Pal | Indian National Congress |
| 1967 | Hirendra Nath Mukherjee | Communist Party of India | Balai Chandra Pal | Indian National Congress |
| 1971 | Hirendra Nath Mukherjee | Communist Party of India | Piyus Kanti Dasgupta | Communist Party of India (Marxist) |
| 1977 | Pratap Chandra Chunder | Bharatiya Lok Dal | Hirendranath Mukerjee | Communist Party of India |
| 1980 | Sunil Maitra | Communist Party of India (Marxist) | Ajit Kumar Panja | Indian National Congress (I) |
| 1984 | Ajit Kumar Panja | Indian National Congress | Sunil Maitra | Communist Party of India (Marxist) |
| 1989 | Ajit Kumar Panja | Indian National Congress | Satyasadhan Chakraborty | Communist Party of India (Marxist) |
| 1991 | Ajit Kumar Panja | Indian National Congress | Pratap Chandra Chunder | Janata Dal |
| 1996 | Ajit Kumar Panja | Indian National Congress | Dipen Ghosh | Communist Party of India (Marxist) |
| 1998 | Ajit Kumar Panja | Trinamool Congress | Prasanta Chatterjee | Communist Party of India (Marxist) |
| 1999 | Ajit Kumar Panja | All India Trinamool Congress | Mohammad Salim | Communist Party of India (Marxist) |
| 2004 | Mohammad Salim | Communist Party of India (Marxist) | Ajit Kumar Panja | All India Trinamool Congress |

In 1957 and 1962 the constituency was Calcutta Central

== See also ==
- Kolkata
- List of constituencies of the Lok Sabha
