= Dhakuria Assembly constituency =

Former West Bengal Legislative Assembly constituency

Dhakuria
- Former constituency No. 151 for the West Bengal Legislative Assembly

Constituency details
- Country: India
- Region: East India
- State: West Bengal
- District: South 24 Parganas
- Lok Sabha constituency: Kolkata Dakshin
- Established: 1967
- Abolished: 2011
- Reservation: None

Dhakuria Assembly constituency was a Legislative Assembly constituency of South 24 Parganas district in the Indian state of West Bengal.

== Overview ==
As a consequence of the orders of the Delimitation Commission, Dhakuria Assembly constituency ceases to exist from 2011.

It was part of Kolkata Dakshin (Lok Sabha constituency). Before 2011, Dhakuria Assembly constituency was composed of the following: Ward Nos. 91, 92, 93, 96, 99, 100 of Kolkata Municipal Corporation. Currently it is a part of Kasba, West Bengal Assembly constituency

== Members of the Legislative Assembly ==
Election Year	Constituency	Name of M.L.A.	Party affiliation
1967	Dhakuria	Somnath Lahiri	Communist Party of India
1969		Somnath Lahiri	Communist Party of India
1971		Somnath Lahiri	Communist Party of India
1972		Somnath Lahiri	Communist Party of India
1977		Jatin Chakraborty	Revolutionary Socialist Party
1982		Jatin Chakraborty	Revolutionary Socialist Party
1987		Jatin Chakraborty	Revolutionary Socialist Party
1991		Kshiti Goswami	Revolutionary Socialist Party
1996		Kshiti Goswami	Revolutionary Socialist Party
2001		Sougata Roy	All India Trinamool Congress
2006		Kshiti Goswami	Revolutionary Socialist Party

== Election results ==
=== 1977-2006 ===
In the 2006 state assembly elections, Kshiti Goswami of RSP won the 151 Dhakuria assembly seat defeating his nearest rival Sougata Roy of Trinamool Congress. Sougata Roy of Trinamool Congress defeated, Kshiti Goswami of RSP in 2001. Kshiti Goswami of RSP defeated Sukhendu Sekhar Roy of Congress in 1996 and Jatin Chakraborty, Independent, in 1991. Jatin Chakraborty of RSP defeated Shankar Kanti Bhowmick of Congress in 1987, Tushar Kanti Dasgupta of Congress in 1982 and Arabinda Prasad Dasgupta of Congress in 1977.

=== 1967-1972 ===
Somnath Lahiri of CPI won the Dhakuria seat in 1972, 1971, 1969 and 1967. Prior to the seat did not exist.
