= Manoj Bhattacharya =

Indian politician (born 1949)

General Secretary of Revolutionary Socialist Party
- Incumbent
- Assumed office 2019
- Preceded by: Kshiti Goswami

Member of Parliament, Rajya Sabha
- In office 3 April 2000 – 2 April 2006
- Constituency: West Bengal

Personal details
- Born: 29 November 1949 (age 76)
- Party: Revolutionary Socialist Party
- Profession: Politician

Manoj Bhattacharya (born 29 November 1949) is a veteran Indian politician who served as the member of parliament in Rajya Sabha from West Bengal. He is the General Secretary of Revolutionary Socialist Party.
