= Burtola Assembly constituency =

Former constituency of the West Bengal Legislative Assembly, in India

Coordinates: 22.593°N 88.371°E

Burtola
- Former constituency No. 158 for the West Bengal Legislative Assembly

Constituency details
- Country: India
- Region: East India
- State: West Bengal
- District: Kolkata
- Lok Sabha constituency: Calcutta North East
- Established: 1951
- Abolished: 2011
- Reservation: None

Burtola Assembly constituency was a Legislative Assembly constituency of Kolkata district in the Indian state of West Bengal.

== Overview ==
As a consequence of the orders of the Delimitation Commission, Burtola Assembly constituency ceases to exist from 2011.

It was part of Calcutta North East (Lok Sabha constituency).

== Members of the Legislative Assembly ==
Election Year	Constituency	Name of M.L.A.	Party affiliation
1951	Burtola	Nirmal Chandra Dey	Independent
1957	Burtola North	Sudhir Chandra Roy Choudhury	Praja Socialist Party
1957	Burtola South	Amarendra Nath Basu	Independent
1962	Burtola South	Amarendra Nath Basu	Communist Party of India
1967		Nikhil Das	Revolutionary Socialist Party
1969		Nikhil Das	Revolutionary Socialist Party
1971		Ajit Kumar Panja	Indian National Congress
1972		Ajit Kumar Panja	Indian National Congress
1977		Nikhil Das	Revolutionary Socialist Party
1982		Ajit Kumar Panja	Indian National Congress
1987		Sadhan Pandey	Indian National Congress
1991		Sadhan Pandey	Indian National Congress
1996		Sadhan Pandey	Indian National Congress
2001		Sadhan Pandey	All India Trinamool Congress
2006		Sadhan Pandey	All India Trinamool Congress

== Results ==
=== 1977-2006 ===
Sadhan Pande representing Trinamool Congress won the 158 Burtolla assembly seat defeating Kalyan Mukherjee of RSP in 2006 and 2001. Earlier, Sadhan Pande, representing Congress defeated Parimal Routh of RSP in 1996 and 1991, and Sunil Sengupta of RSP in 1987. Ajit Kumar Panja of Congress defeated Nikhil Das of RSP in 1982. Nikhil Das of RSP defeated Ajit Kumar Panja of Congress in 1977.

=== 1951-1972 ===
Ajit Kumar Panja won in 1972 and 1971 defeating Lakshmi Kanta Roy of CPI(M) in both years. Nikhil Das of RSP won in 1969 defeating Ajit Kumar Panja of Congress and in 1967 defeating S.C.R. Chaudhuri of Congress. Amarendra Nath Basu of CPI won the Burtolla South in 1962 defeating Suhrid Rudra of Congress. In 1957, Burtolla had two seats. Sudhir Chandra Ray Chaudhuri of PSP won the Burtola North seat defeating Aparesh Bhattacharya of Congress. Amarendra Nath Basu Independent won the Burtola South seat defeating Suhrid Rudra of Congress. In independent India’s first election Nirmal Chandra De of Congress won the Burtola seat defeating Sudhir Roy Chuoudhury of KMPP by 492 votes, Nilamber Chatterjee of Forward Bloc (Marxists) and others.
