= Supti Pandey =

Indian politician

Member of the West Bengal Legislative Assembly
- In office 13 July 2024 – 04 May 2026
- Preceded by: Sadhan Pande
- Succeeded by: Tapas Roy
- Constituency: Maniktala

Personal details
- Party: Trinamool Congress (2024–present)
- Spouse: Sadhan Pande

Supti Pandey is an Indian politician from West Bengal. As a member of Trinamool Congress, she is the Former MLA from Maniktala. She is the widow of Sadhan Pande.

== Experience as an MLA ==
Supti Pandey on Saturday stretched her husband and former minister Sadhan Pandey’s political legacy in Maniktala by several notches when she polled 71.7% votes, winning the assembly bypoll by 62,312 votes. She polled 83,110 votes, nearly four times of 20,798 polled by BJP’s Kalyan Chaubey. Since 2011, Sadhan Pandey had won from Maniktala thrice but never with this margin. Trinamool insiders admitted this was a hard-earned victory. The Lok Sabha election results showed that Trinamool was trailing in several Maniktala wards. Even in Goabagan, where the Pandeys live, BJP was ahead. The party’s performance in housing complexes was also poor. Overall, Maniktala, a month ago, had only given Trinamool a 3,500-plus lead. Like she had done to bin the rising discordant voices in the party ranks ahead of the LS polls in Kolkata North, CM Mamata Banerjee took up the reins herself. She hand-picked Supti — her college friend — as the candidate, formed a core committee and appointed former Rajya Sabha MP Kunal Ghosh as its convener. It included Kolkata’s deputy mayor Atin Ghosh, Beliaghata MLA Paresh Pal and MMiC Swapan Samaddar. Additionally, Anindya Raut, councillor of ward 13, was given the responsibility of Supti’s poll agent. Several of them are known to be opposed to the Pandeys. It was Ghosh’s job to be a liaison. Supti said, "I am grateful to my party workers, councillors, block leaders, my daughter (Shreya) and on top of all…Madam Mamata Banerjee. I will give my hundred percent to protect my husband’s legacy. Till now I was on the sidelines, supporting my husband in polls after polls. I will carry out his work. People know very well the kind of development he had done under the leadership of CM Banerjee." Shreya, who had largely relegated herself to the sidelines during poll campaign, was seen with her mother at counting centre on Saturday. Wearing a green saree, she said, "I miss my father a lot today." Shreya added, "My mother was my father’s backbone. She will work very well." When asked if she regrets not being a candidate, Shreya dismissed the question. She said, "There is a cherished relationship between my mother and Mamata Banerjee. When they talk, it feels like a conversation between two friends." Chaubey raised allegations of rigging again. In one booth, he alleged that out of 679 votes cast, BJP got only 3.
