= Somnath Lahiri =

Indian writer and politician (1901–1984)

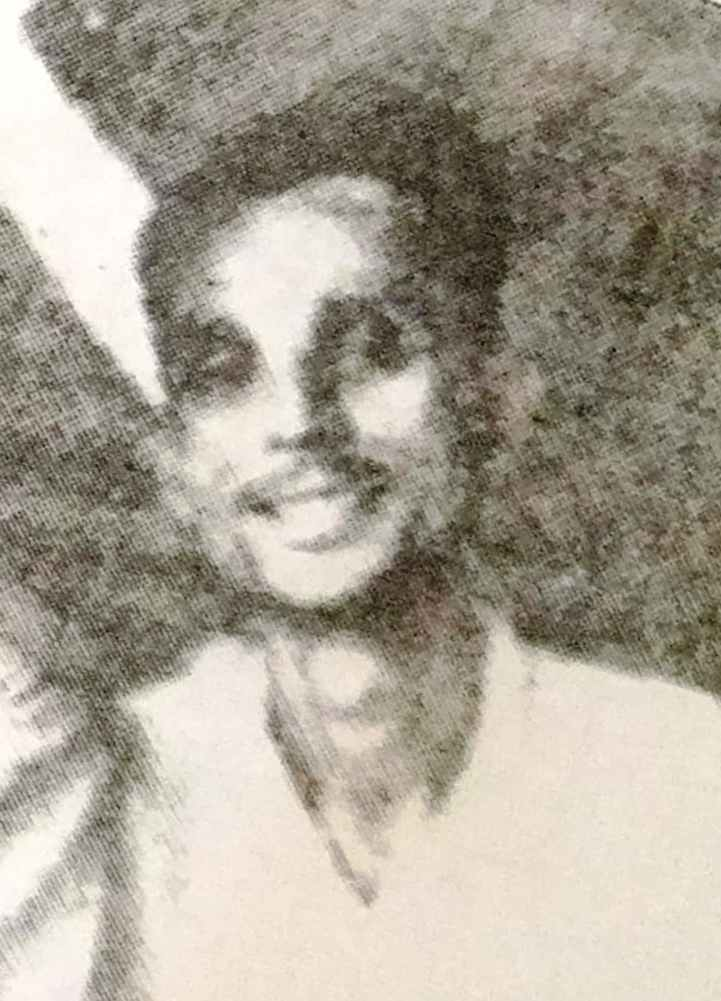

Member of Constituent Assembly of India
- In office 9 December 1946 – 24 January 1950

Member of West Bengal Legislative Assembly
- In office 1967–1977
- Preceded by: Office created
- Succeeded by: Jatin Chakraborty
- Constituency: Dhakuria
- In office 1957–1967
- Preceded by: Satyendra Kumar Basu
- Succeeded by: Mani Sanyal
- Constituency: Alipore

Minister of Information, Government of West Bengal
- In office 1967-1968

Minister of Local Self Government, Development and Planning, West Bengal
- In office 1969-1970

General Secretary of CPI (Interim)
- In office 1935
- Preceded by: S. S. Mirajkar
- Succeeded by: P. C. Joshi

Personal details
- Born: 1 September 1909
- Died: 19 October 1984 (aged 75)
- Citizenship: Indian
- Party: Communist Party of India
- Occupation: Political Activist and Writer

Somnath Lahiri (1 September 1909 – 19 October 1984) was an Indian politician, writer and leader of Communist Party of India. He was a member of the Constituent Assembly of India from West Bengal. He was later elected as a Member of West Bengal Legislative Assembly from 1957 to 1977 and also served as a minister from 1967 to 1970.

== Early life ==
Somnath Lahiri became attracted to Marxism under the guidance of Bengali revolutionary Bhupendranath Datta in 1930. Initially, he worked in East Bengal Railway workers' union and played an important role with Dr. Ronen Sen and Abdul Halim in building the Communist party's Calcutta Committee.

== Early political life ==
Lahiri joined the Communist party in 1931, and started working in rail and tram workers union in Kolkata. In 1933, he organised the first labour association of Tata Iron & Steel in Jamshedpur.

He was also elected as an interim general secretary of the CPI in 1935 following the arrest of S. S. Mirajkar. However, Lahiri himself was arrested a few months later and was replaced by P. C. Joshi.

According to the party's resolution of 1938, he became attached with Muzaffar Ahmed and Bankim Mukherjee and joined the Left consolidation committee. He also led the historical Sweeper strike of Kolkata Municipal Corporation in 1944.

Lahiri moved base to Bengal and started working in the state. He was elected CPI councillor of the Calcutta Municipal Corporation along with Muhammad Ismail from the Labour Constituency in 1944.

== Constituent Assembly ==
Lahiri was the sole Communist member in the Constituent Assembly in 1946 elected from Bengal. He also substantially contributed to the debates regarding drafting of the Constitution of India.

On the issue of right to privacy, Lahiri took a progressive view. On 30 April 1947, Lahiri proposed to make the right to privacy of correspondence a fundamental right. However, his proposal did not receive any traction.

Somnath Lahiri had said in CAD, Vol III, p. 404. that - "I feel that many of these fundamental rights have been framed from the point of view of a police Constable… you will find that very minimum rights have been conceded and are almost invariably followed by a proviso. Almost every article is followed by a proviso which takes away the right almost completely,..What should be our conception of fundamental rights ?....We want to incorporate every one of those rights which our people want to get."

== Later political career ==
Lahiri was elected to the CPI central committee during the first party congress in the 1943 and the second party congress in 1948.

However, he was later isolated in the party and was removed from the central committee, following the removal of B. T. Ranadive in June 1950 as the party denounced the BTR line which called for violent overthrow of the government.

The party criticised the line as "left adventurism" and elected a new central committee in 1951.

Later he was elected to the West Bengal Legislative Assembly six times between 1957 and 1977. He was elected from the Alipore in 1957 and 1962.

After the party split between CPI and Communist Party of India (Marxist), he remained with the CPI.

In 1967 West Bengal Legislative Assembly election, he moved to Dhakuria. He continued to represent Dhakuria in the assembly in 1969, 1971 and 1972.

In the 1967 elections, with CPI and CPI(M) fighting against each other, Lahiri came out victorious in a triangular contest.

Subsequently, he became a minister in the two United Front Governments. He held the position of cabinet minister in charge of information and culture for West Bengal in 1967. In 1969, he became the minister for local self-government and public works.

He did not contest the 1977 West Bengal Legislative Assembly election.

== Works ==
Somnath Lahiri was a well known political intellectual and writer. In 1931 he translated the book The State and Revolution to Bengali. Samyobad (Socialism) is another book of his. He was the editor of Swadhinata, a daily left political magazine. He also wrote many articles in Ganashakti, Aage Cholo, Kalanatar, Kalijuger Golpo. The short stories collection of Somnath Lahiri was first published in 1967.

He brought out the first Bangla and Hindi journals, Abhijan and Jangi Mazdur, of and for the working class.

== Personal life ==
"Lahiri led an exceptionally simple, unassuming life. He had an acerbic tongue and an inimitable sense of humour. He had varied interests beyond politics—he liked to read novels, watch films and theatres, and listen to music and songs. Wielding a facile pen, he also wrote short stories and novels as well".
