= Mohammed Salim (politician) =

Indian politician (b. 1957)

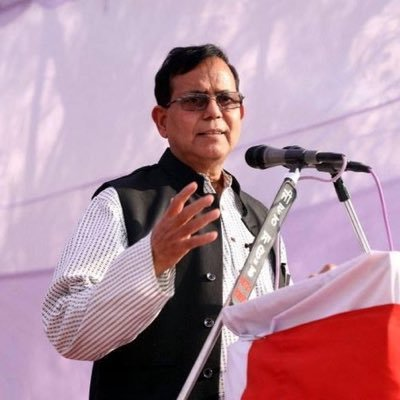
- Salim is delivering a political lecture.

State Secretary of the Communist Party of India (Marxist) – West Bengal
- Incumbent
- Assumed office 16 March 2022
- Preceded by: Surjya Kanta Mishra

Member of Parliament, Lok Sabha
- In office 16 May 2014 – 23 May 2019
- Preceded by: Deepa Dasmunsi
- Succeeded by: Debasree Chaudhuri
- Constituency: Raiganj
- In office 16 May 2004 – 16 May 2009
- Preceded by: Ajit Kumar Panja
- Succeeded by: Constituency abolished
- Constituency: Calcutta North East

Minister for Technical Education and Training, Youth Welfare, Minority Development and Welfare, Self Employment, Government of West Bengal
- In office 16 May 2001 – 17 May 2004
- Preceded by: Satya Sadhan Chakraborty

Member of Legislative Assembly, West Bengal
- In office 14 May 2001 – 17 May 2004
- Preceded by: Sultan Ahmed
- Succeeded by: Md. Abu Sufayen
- Constituency: Entally

Member of Parliament, Rajya Sabha
- In office 3 April 1990 – 16 May 2001
- Constituency: West Bengal

Member of the Polit Bureau of the Communist Party of India (Marxist)
- Incumbent
- Assumed office 19 April 2015
- Preceded by: Buddhadeb Bhattacharya

Personal details
- Born: 5 June 1957 (age 69) Calcutta, West Bengal, India
- Party: Communist Party of India (Marxist)
- Spouse: Dr. Rosina Khatun
- Children: 2
- Education: University of Calcutta; Jadavpur University
- Website: mdsalim.org
- As of 17 September, 2006 Source: []

Mohammed Salim (born 5 June 1957) is an Indian politician who is the State Secretary of the West Bengal branch of the Communist Party of India (Marxist) (CPI(M)). In 2015, he was inducted into the party's Politburo at the 21st Party Congress held in Visakhapatnam. He was a member of the 16th Lok Sabha, representing Raiganj. Earlier, he was a member of the 14th Lok Sabha, representing the Calcutta North East constituency of West Bengal. After delimitation, in the 2009 Lok Sabha election, Salim contested the new Calcutta North constituency and lost to Sudip Bandyopadhyay of the Trinamool Congress. He participated in the 2024 Indian general election as a candidate from the Left Front representing the Murshidabad Lok Sabha constituency.

== Political career ==
In the 14th General Elections held in 2004, Salim won from the Calcutta North East constituency of West Bengal and served as the deputy leader of the CPI(M) Lok Sabha group. After delimitation, in the 2009 Lok Sabha election Salim contested the new Calcutta North constituency, and lost to Sudip Bandyopadhyay of the Trinamool Congress.

He was a member of the 16th Lok Sabha, representing Raiganj constituency. In 2019 Indian general election he again contested from Raiganj but lost to Debasree Chaudhuri of Bharatiya Janata Party gathering only 14.25% votes and losing his security deposit after coming third. He also served as the deputy leader of the CPI(M) Lok Sabha group between 2004 and 2009 and again between 2014 and 2019. He also contested from the Chanditala Vidhan Sabha Constituency in the 2021 West Bengal Legislative Assembly election, but lost to actor Swati Khandoker of TMC with a margin over 60,000 votes.

He was also elected to the Central Committee of the Communist Party of India (Marxist) in 1998. He was later inducted in the state committee and state secretariat in 2006. He was elected to the politburo of C.P.I.(M.) in the 21st party congress organised at Visakhapatnam in 2015.

== Electoral history ==
Salim has been elected as Member of Parliament, Lok Sabha twice and served as a Member of Parliament, Rajya Sabha for two terms. He was also elected as Member of Legislative Assembly from the Entally (Vidhan Sabha constituency).

Election Year	Office for	Constituency	Party Affiliation	Result	Winner or Nearest Rival	
1990	Member of Parliament, Rajya Sabha	West Bengal	Communist Party of India (Marxist)	Won	Uncontested	
1996	Member of Parliament, Rajya Sabha	West Bengal	Communist Party of India (Marxist)	Won	Uncontested	
1999	Member of Parliament, Lok Sabha	Calcutta North East Lok Sabha constituency	Communist Party of India (Marxist)	Lost	Ajit Kumar Panja	All India Trinamool Congress
2001	Member of the legislative assembly	Entally Assembly Constituency	Communist Party of India (Marxist)	Won	Sultan Ahmed	All India Trinamool Congress
2004	Member of Parliament, Lok Sabha	Calcutta North East Lok Sabha constituency	Communist Party of India (Marxist)	Won	Ajit Kumar Panja	All India Trinamool Congress
2009	Member of Parliament, Lok Sabha	Kolkata Uttar Lok Sabha	Communist Party of India (Marxist)	Lost	Sudip Bandyopadhyay	All India Trinamool Congress
2014	Member of Parliament, Lok Sabha	Raiganj Lok Sabha constituency	Communist Party of India (Marxist)	Won	Deepa Dasmunsi	Indian National Congress
2019	Member of Parliament, Lok Sabha	Raiganj Lok Sabha constituency	Communist Party of India (Marxist)	Lost (3rd)	Debasree Chaudhuri	Bharatiya Janata Party
2021	Member of the legislative assembly	Chanditala Assembly Constituency	Communist Party of India (Marxist)	Lost (3rd)	Swati Khandoker	All India Trinamool Congress
2024	Member of Parliament, Lok Sabha	Murshidabad Lok Sabha constituency	Communist Party of India (Marxist)	Lost	Abu Taher Khan	All India Trinamool Congress

== See also ==
- Communist Party of India (Marxist), West Bengal
