= Somen Mitra =

Indian politician (1941–2020)

Somendra Nath Mitra

President of the West Bengal Pradesh Congress Committee
- In office 16 September 2018 – 30 July 2020
- Preceded by: Adhir Ranjan Chowdhury
- Succeeded by: Adhir Ranjan Chowdhury
- In office 1992–1998
- Preceded by: Siddhartha Shankar Ray
- Succeeded by: A. B. A. Ghani Khan Choudhury

Member of Parliament, Lok Sabha
- In office 16 May 2009 – 28 January 2014
- Preceded by: Samik Lahiri
- Succeeded by: Abhishek Banerjee
- Constituency: Diamond Harbour

Member of West Bengal Legislative Assembly
- In office 1972–1977
- Preceded by: Binoy Banerjee
- Succeeded by: Binoy Banerjee
- Constituency: Sealdah
- In office 1982–2009
- Preceded by: Binoy Banerjee
- Succeeded by: Sikha Mitra

Personal details
- Born: 31 December 1941 Katorah, Bengal Province, British India
- Died: 30 July 2020 (aged 78) Kolkata, West Bengal, India
- Cause of death: Cardiac arrest
- Party: Indian National Congress
- Other political affiliations: Trinamool Congress (2008-2014)
- Spouse: Sikha Mitra
- Children: 1
- Education: Bangabasi College
- Alma mater: University of Calcutta (BSc, LLB)

Somendra Nath Mitra (31 December 1941 – 30 July 2020), popularly known as Somen Mitra, was an Indian politician. He was a member of the 15th Lok Sabha, elected from the Diamond Harbour constituency in West Bengal state in 2009 as a Trinamool Congress candidate. He was a member of the West Bengal Legislative Assembly from Sealdah from 1972 to 2009. He was the president of the state unit of the Indian National Congress. In July 2008, he left the Indian National Congress and formed a new party, named Pragatisheel Indira Congress. In October 2009, the political party founded by him was officially merged with the Trinamool Congress. He rejoined his parent party Congress in January 2014, before that he resigned as MP. He became the president of West Bengal Pradesh Congress Committee for the second time on 22 September 2018 and served until his death on 30 July 2020.

Lok Sabha
Preceded by Samik Lahiri	Member of Parliament in Lok Sabha for Diamond Harbour; 2009 – 2014	Succeeded by Abhishek Banerjee
Political offices
Preceded by Siddhartha Shankar Ray	President of West Bengal Pradesh Congress Committee; 1992–1998	Succeeded by A. B. A. Ghani Khan Choudhury
Preceded by Adhir Ranjan Chowdhury	President of West Bengal Pradesh Congress Committee; 2018–2020	Succeeded by Vacant
