= Sadhan Pande =

Indian politician (1950–2022)

Minister for Consumer Affairs & Self Help Group & Self-Employment, Government Of West Bengal
- In office 20 May 2011 – 9 November 2021
- Governor: M. K. Narayanan; D. Y. Patil (additional charge); Keshari Nath Tripathi; Jagdeep Dhankhar
- Chief Minister: Mamata Banerjee
- Succeeded by: Sashi Panja (Self Help Group and Self Employment) Manas Bhunia (Consumer Affairs)

Member of West Bengal Legislative Assembly
- In office 13 May 2011 – 20 February 2022
- Governor: M. K. Narayanan
- Preceded by: Rupa Bagchi
- Constituency: Maniktala
- In office 1985–2011
- Preceded by: Ajit Kumar Panja
- Succeeded by: constituency abolished
- Constituency: Burtola

Personal details
- Born: 13 November 1950 Kolkata, West Bengal, India
- Died: 20 February 2022 (aged 71) Mumbai, Maharashtra, India
- Party: Trinamool Congress (1998–2022); Indian National Congress (1979–1998)
- Spouse: Supti Pandey
- Children: Shreya Pande
- Education: University of Calcutta

Sadhan Pande (13 November 1950 – 20 February 2022) was an Indian politician who served as Minister for Consumer Affairs & Self Help Group & Self-Employment, Government of West Bengal. He was also an MLA, elected from the Maniktala constituency in the 2011 West Bengal state assembly election. Previously, he was a Congress Leader and six times elected MLA from Burtola till 2011. After his defeat in Lok Sabha Elections 1998, from Calcutta North East, he left Congress and joined Trinamool Congress. Pande died in Mumbai on 20 February 2022, at the age of 71. He suffered from kidney ailments prior to his death.
