= Hirendranath Mukherjee =

Indian politician (1907–2004)

Padma Vibhushan Hirendranath Mukerjee MP
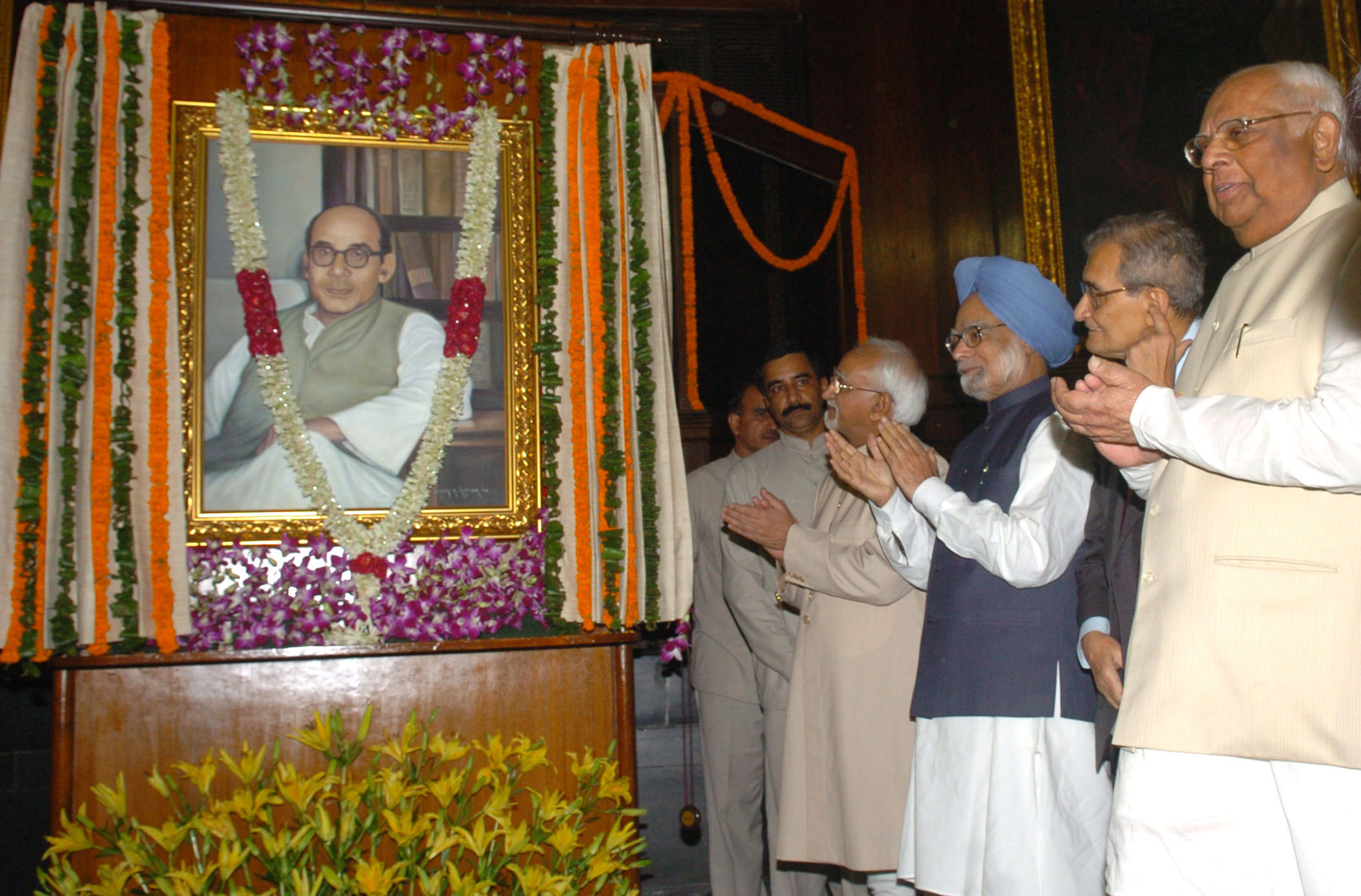

Member of Parliament, Lok Sabha
- In office 1952–1977
- Preceded by: New Seat
- Succeeded by: Pratap Chandra Chunder
- Constituency: Calcutta North East

Personal details
- Born: 23 November 1907 Kolkata, Bengal Presidency British India
- Died: 30 July 2004 (aged 96)
- Party: Communist Party of India
- Spouse: Bibha Chatterjee

Hirendranath Mukhopadhyay (23 November 1907 – 30 July 2004), also known as Hiren Mukerjee, was an Indian politician, lawyer and academic. He was a member of the Communist Party of India having joined in 1936 when it was still illegal. He was elected to the Lok Sabha the lower house of the Indian Parliament from the Calcutta North East constituency in 1951, 1957, 1962, 1967 and 1971. He suffered an electoral reverse when he lost to Pratap Chandra Chunder in 1977 after the CPI supported Emergency.

He was awarded the second highest civilian honour Padma Vibhushan by Government of India in 1991, earlier he was awarded the Padma Bhushan in 1990. He was a profound and passionate orator in English and Bengali, and his natural eloquence was marked by a surpassing erudition and encyclopaedic memory. His speeches were also marked by a full-throated delivery, an impeccable Oxonian pronunciation in English and his Calcutta idiom and intonation in Bengali. He was known for his oratory in Parliament.

== Early life and education ==
Born in Calcutta (now Kolkata) in a Brahmin family to Sachindra Nath Mukerjee, he studied at Taltala High School and received B.A. and M.A. degrees in History from Presidency College, Calcutta, then affiliated with the University of Calcutta. Thereafter he completed his higher education with B. Litt. (Oxon) from St Catherine's College, Oxford and Barrister-at-Law (Comm.) from Lincoln's Inn, London.

== Career ==
Hiren Mukerjee started his career as an educator, eventually serving as a senior lecturer in History and Politics, Andhra University, 1934–35, lecturer in History and Political Philosophy, Calcutta University, 1940—44, and remained the Head of the Department of History, Surendranath College, Calcutta from 1936 to 1962. He joined the Communist Party of India in 1936. Conversion to communism came somewhat earlier, while studying at Oxford and training to be a Barrister at Law in the United Kingdom. He was Member, All India Congress Committee (A.I.C.C.), 1938–39; Member of Executive Committee, Bengal Provincial Congress Committee, 1938–39; Joint Secretary, Bengal Committee, Congress Socialist Party, 1938; President, Bengal Provincial Students' Conference, 1936; Founder Member, All India Progressive Writers' Association, 1936; President, All India Students' Conference, Nagpur, 1940; Editor "Indo-Soviet Journal", Calcutta, 1941–45; Chairman, Indian Peoples' Theatre Association (IPTA) Conference, Bombay, 1943; Founder Member, Friends of Soviet Union, and Joint Secretary, 1944–52; Joint Editor, "Calcutta Weekly Notes" (Law Journal), 1945–52; Member, Bengal Committee, Communist Party of India, 1947–49; President, Bengal Motion Pictures Employees' Union since 1946; Vice-President, Bengal Provincial Trade Union Congress, 1948–49. Suffered imprisonment without trial twice – in 1948 and 1949.

He won five consecutive elections from the Calcutta North East constituency in 1952, 1957, 1962, 1967 and 1971. He was elected to the first elected Parliament of independent India (1952–57) from a Calcutta constituency which returned him five times repeatedly till 1977 (Member, First Lok Sabha, 1952–57; Second Lok Sabha 1957–62; Third Lok Sabha, 1962–67; Fourth Lok Sabha, 1967–70 and Fifth Lok Sabha, 1971–77).

He was the leader of CPI group, 1964 – 67. Deputy Leader, 1952 – 64, 1967 – 71. Member, Public Accounts Committee, 1969–70 and 1973–74; Chairman, Public Accounts Committee, 1975–76 and 1976–77; Member, Indian Delegation to the Commonwealth Parliamentary Conference (1959) in Australia, Inter-Parliamentary Union Conference (1972) in Italy, Yaounde, Cameroon (W. Africa), April 1972, and Rome, September 1972.

He was also the honorary Adviser, Parliament Library and Bureau of Parliamentary Studies and Training, 1978–82; and Honorary Advisor to the Speaker of Lok Sabha, 1978–82.

He was invited to International Teach-In by Toronto University, Canada (1966); invited to lecture at German Academy, Berlin, 1967; invited to take part in International Symposium on Lenin at Alma Ata, Kazakhstan, USSR in 1969; invited to deliver lectures at many universities in India and overseas.

In spite of political preoccupation, he was also an academic. He received honorary degree of D.Litt. from Andhra University, Calcutta University, Kalyani University, North Bengal University and Rabindra Bharati University. He was awarded Soviet Land Nehru Prize in 1978; and was the recipient of Vidyasagar Award (1992) and Nazrul Award (2000) from the Government of West Bengal and Advaita Mallavarmana Award from the Government of Tripura (2002), Maulana Azad Award by the Muslim Cultural Association and Muzaffar Ahmed Smriti Puraskar.

He was awarded Padma Bhushan in 1990 and Padma Vibhushan in 1991 by the President of India for his lifelong services.

He was a writer of numerous articles in both English and Bengali over seven decades; author of nearly 50 published books.

Hiren Mukerjee wrote in both English and Bengali, utilizing a style that ranged from formal vocabulary to colloquial terms and incorporated a wide array of references. He was an active letter writer who personally handwrote responses to his correspondents throughout his life. Additionally, he possessed a strong command of Sanskrit and frequently quoted from it in his speeches and writings.

Notwithstanding his shining qualities and often fiery eloquence, in personal demeanour Hiren Mukerjee was a quiet and unassuming personality, even to the point of shyness. He died in Kolkata on 30 July 2004 at the age of 96. Hailed as the Communist Rishi (ref. Sri Gopal Gandhi's obituary in The Hindu dated 1 August 2004), Hirendra Nath Mukerjee left lasting impression on our national life. Appropriately, the Parliament of India instituted the "Professor Hiren Mukerjee Memorial Parliamentary Lecture" from 2008 (Hiren Mukerjee's birth centenary year). The lecture was the first of its kind in the history of Indian Parliament and indeed a tribute to one of the notable parliamentarians of India. Held in the Central Hall of Parliament, the first four Memorial Lectures were delivered by Nobel-Laureate Professor Amartya Sen (2008), Nobel Laureate economist/banker Md Yunus (2009), eminent economist Prof. Jagdish Bhagwati (2010) and the Prime Minister of Bhutan, H. E. Lyonchen Jigmi Y. Thinley (2012). The Lok Sabha Secretariat also produced a publication entitled "Hiren Mukerjee in Parliament" compiling some of his important speeches in the Lok Sabha spanning 25 years.
