= Ajit Panja =

Indian politician

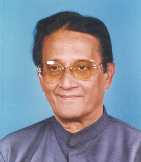
- Panja in 1984

Chairperson of the All India Trinamool Congress
- In office 1998 – 2001
- Preceded by: Office established
- Succeeded by: Mamata Banerjee

Member of the Indian Parliament for Calcutta North East
- In office 1984–2004
- Preceded by: Sunil Maitra
- Succeeded by: Mohammed Salim

Union Minister of State for External Affairs
- In office 13 October 1999 – 16 March 2001

Union Minister of State for Coal (Independent Charge)
- In office 8 July 1993 – 28 April 1996

Union Minister of State for Information & Broadcasting (Independent Charge)
- In office 19 July 1991 – 11 March 1993

Union Minister of State for Finance
- In office 3 January 1988 – 4 May 1989

Union Minister of State for Information & Broadcasting (Independent Charge)
- In office 28 April 1986 – 2 January 1988

Union Minister of State for Food and Civil Supplies
- In office 12 March 1986 – 17 April 1986

Union Minister of State for Planning
- In office 5 March 1985 – 21 March 1986

President of the West Bengal Pradesh Congress Committee
- In office 1980–1981
- Preceded by: A. B. A. Ghani Khan Choudhury
- Succeeded by: Ananda Gopal Mukherjee
- Constituency: Burtola

Minister for Health, Family Planning and Water Supply, Calcutta Corporation, Municipal Affairs & Forest Development Government of West Bengal
- In office 2 April 1972 – 21 June 1977

Minister for Judiciary and Parliamentary Affairs Government of West Bengal
- In office 5 April 1971 – 21 March 1972

MLA
- In office 1971–1977 – 1982–1984
- Preceded by: Nikhil Das
- Succeeded by: Sadhan Pandey
- Constituency: Burtola

Personal details
- Born: Ajit Kumar Panja; 13 September 1936 Kolkata, Bengal Presidency, British India
- Died: 14 November 2008 (aged 72) Kolkata
- Cause of death: Mouth cancer
- Party: All India Trinamool Congress (1998–2008)
- Other political affiliations: Indian National Congress (1962–1998)
- Spouse: Jaya Panja
- Relatives: Ranjit Kumar Panja (Brother); Shashi Panja (daughter-in-law)
- As of 30 July, 2008 Source: Calcutta Yellow Pages

Ajit Kumar Panja (13 September 1936 – 14 November 2008) was a Union minister of state in the Government of India. He was a member of Indian National Congress but left it to join Trinamool Congress. He was born in Calcutta, and studied law at the Scottish Church College, Calcutta and at the Lincoln's Inn. His native village was a small village in Burdwan district, named Majigram. A lawyer by profession, he authored many books. He was also a stage actor who enacted the role of Ramakrishna Paramahansa in Kolkata.

== Life and career ==
Ajit Kumar Panja was born in Kolkata on 13 September 1936. His father was Dhanapati Panja.

Apart from political career he started performing on stage theatre in the role of "Sri Ramakrishma Paramhansa" in the play "Sri Sri Ramakrishna" (made according to the story of Noti Binodini written by Late. Brajendra Kishore Dey) organised by Kolkata High Court Advocate's Drama Association in India. The play was staged in London and USA (Washington, Chicago, New York and Los Angeles).

Ajit Panja died of oral cancer on 14 November 2008 at the Peerless Hospital.

== Positions held ==
- 1971,1972-77 Member, West Bengal Legislative Assembly and 1982–84
- 1971-72 Cabinet Minister, Judiciary and Parliamentary Affairs (Home), West Bengal
- 1972-77 Cabinet Minister, Health and Family Planning and Water Supply,
- 1973 Member, All India Congress Committee (A.I.C.C.)
- 1977 President, District Congress Committee (D.C.C.) (I), North Calcutta, West Bengal
- 1980-81 President, Pradesh Congress Committee (P.C.C.)(I), West Bengal
- 1984 Elected to 8th Lok Sabha
- 1985-86 Union Minister of State, Planning
- 1986 Union Minister of State, Food and Civil Supplies
- 1986-88 Union Minister of State, Information and Broadcasting (Independent Charge)
- 1988-89 Union Minister of State, Finance
- 1989 Re-elected to 9th Lok Sabha (2nd term)
- 1990 Member, Committee of Privileges Member, Consultative Committee, Ministry of Finance
- 1990-91 Member, Committee on Public Accounts Member, Informal Consultative

Committee, Railway Zone

- 1991 Re-elected to 10th Lok Sabha (3rd term)
- 1991-93 Union Minister of State, Information and Broadcasting (Independent Charge)
- 1993-95 Union Minister of State, Coal (Independent Charge)
- 1996 Re-elected to 11th Lok Sabha (4th term)
- 1996-97 Member, Committee on Energy Member, Business Advisory Committee
- 1998 Re-elected to 12th Lok Sabha (5th term) Chief Whip, West Bengal Trinamool Congress Parliamentary Party
- 1998-99 Member, Committee on Industry Member, Consultative Committee, Ministry of Urban Affairs and Employment Chairman, West Bengal Trinamool Congress
- 1999 Re-elected to 13th Lok Sabha (6th term)
- 13 Oct 1999 to 2004 Union Minister of State, External Affairs

== Electoral History ==
=== Lok Sabha ===
Year	Constituency	Party	Votes	%	Opponent	Party	Votes	%	Result	Margin	%
1980	Calcutta North East	INC(I)	160,882	41.05	Sunil Moitra	CPI(M)	187,951	47.95	Lost	-27,069	-6.90
1984	Calcutta North East	INC	284,324	57.11	Sunil Maitra	CPI(M)	195,748	39.32	Won	+88,576	+17.79
1989	Calcutta North East	INC	305,237	51.59	Satyasadhan Chakraborty	CPI(M)	277,608	46.92	Won	+27,629	+4.67
1991	Calcutta North East	INC	276,399	49.52	Pratap Chandra	JD	204,943	36.72	Won	+71,456	+12.80
1996	Calcutta North East	INC	335,855	51.98	Dipen Ghosh	CPI(M)	270,870	41.93	Won	+64,985	+10.05
1998	Calcutta North East	AITC	310,361	47.10	Prasanta Chatterjee	CPI(M)	245,489	37.26	Won	+64,872	+9.84
1999	Calcutta North East	AITC	297,491	45.17	Md. Salim	CPI(M)	255,917	38.86	Won	+41,574	+6.31
2004	Calcutta North East	AITC	210,647	37.03	Md. Salim	CPI(M)	284,427	50.00	Lost	-73,780	-12.97

== Books published ==
- Encephalitis Attack in West Bengal
- CPM Gun Shoot to Kill (English and Bengali)
- Ganatantra Hatya (Bengali)
- Siksha Khethre Nairajya (Bengali)
- Sansad Bichitra (Bengali)
- PM (Sh. V.P. Singh) challenged to prove charges (English)
- Dunkel Agreement (Bengali)
- Unemployment Problems in India How to solve it (Bengali)
- Era of Excellence of Narasimha Rao Govt 4th Yr-Major Achievements and Decisions
- Mining Medicines Hand Book for Health Workers and Mine Workers
