= Pragatisheel Indira Congress =

- Founder: Somendra Nath Mitra
- Founded: 19 July 2008; 17 years ago
- Dissolved: October 2009; 16 years ago
- Split from: Indian National Congress
- Merged into: All India Trinamool Congress
- Student wing: Pragatisheel Chhatra Dal
- Youth wing: Pragatisheel Yuva Dal
- Ideology: Nationalism; Democratic socialism Socialism
- Colours: Green
- ECI Status: Dissolved party
- Alliance: UPA
- Seats in: 0 / 295 (West Bengal Legislative Assembly) 0 / 235 (Tamil Nadu Legislature)

Pragatisheel India Congress (PIC) was a political party in India that was formed by Somendra Nath Mitra. In July 2008, Somendra Nath Mitra left the Indian National Congress and formed the PIC. In October 2009, the party was officially merged with the All India Trinamool Congress.

== See also ==
- Indian National Congress breakaway parties
- Indian National Congress (R)
