= Subhankar Sarkar =

Indian politician

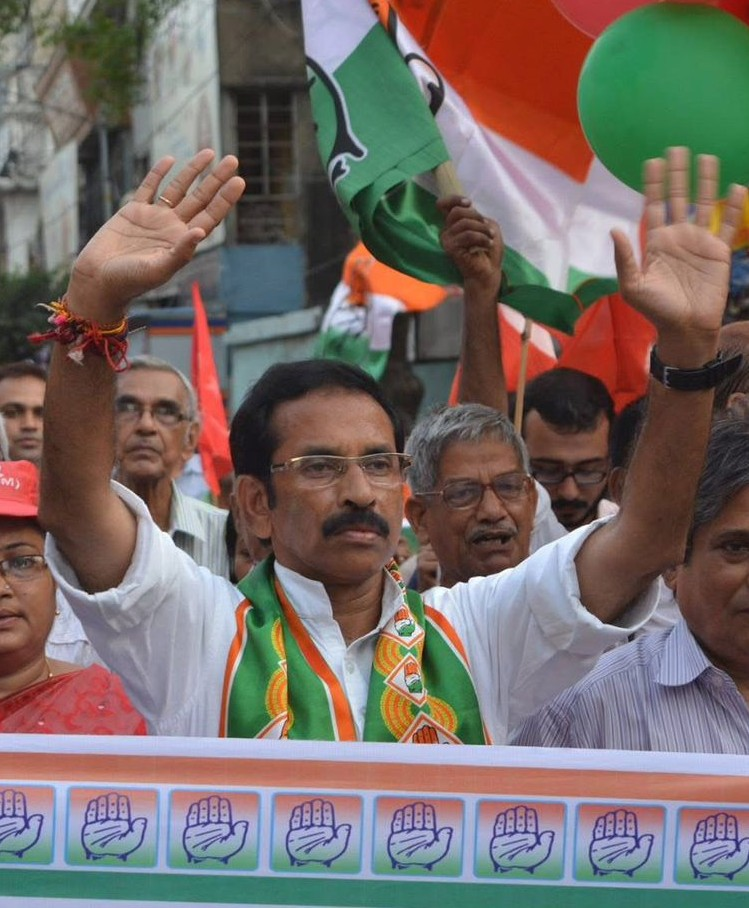

President West Bengal Pradesh Congress Committee
- Incumbent
- Assumed office 21 September 2024
- President: Mallikarjun Kharge
- Preceded by: Adhir Ranjan Chowdhury

National Secretary of All India Congress Committee
- In office September 2023 – 21 September 2024

Indian National Congress State-In-Charge of Arunachal Pradesh, Meghalaya and Mizoram PCC
- In office September 2023 – 21 September 2024

Personal details
- Born: 2 January 1960 (age 66) Medinipur, West Bengal, India
- Party: Indian National Congress
- Spouse: Loora Ray Sarkar
- Children: 2 sons (Andolan Sarkar and Aloran Sarkar)
- Parent: Debabrata Sarkar (Father) Bijon Bala Sarkar (Mother)
- Occupation: Social Worker; Politician

Subhankar Sarkar (born 2 January 1960) is an Indian politician from West Bengal representing the Indian National Congress. He is currently serving as President of West Bengal Pradesh Congress Committee.

On 21 September 2024, he was appointed as State President of the West Bengal Congress. Prior to this appointment, he served as National Secretary of the All India Congress Committee and the Indian National Congress State-In-Charge of Arunachal Pradesh Congress Committee, Meghalaya Pradesh Congress Committee and Mizoram Pradesh Congress Committee. He had previously served as National Secretary of the All India Congress Committee and State-In-Charge of Odisha between 2013 and 2018.

== Electoral history ==
He unsuccessfully contested 2021 West Bengal Legislative Assembly election as Indian National Congress candidate from Noapara.

He contested the 2026 West Bengal Legislative Assembly election as State President of West Bengal Pradesh Congress Committee and Indian National Congress candidate from Sreerampur.

== Positions held ==
Positions held by Subhankar Sarkar in the Indian National Congress and other wings associated with the party.
Year	Positions held
1993–1996	National General Secretary & Spokesperson of the National Students' Union of India
1996–2004	State President of the National Students' Union of India, West Bengal Chhatra Parishad
2004–2006	National General Secretary of the Indian Youth Congress
2007–2009	Secretary, West Bengal Pradesh Congress Committee
2007–2013	Spokesperson, West Bengal Pradesh Congress Committee
2013	General Secretary, West Bengal Pradesh Congress Committee
2013–2018	Member of the Lok Sabha and Assembly Screening Committee, All India Congress Committee for Kerala, Jammu & Kashmir, Tamil Nadu, Manipur & Pondicherry
2013–2018	National Secretary, All India Congress Committee
2018–2020	Convenor of the Coordination Committee, West Bengal Bengal Pradesh Congress Committee
2024 - 2024	National Secretary, All India Congress Committee and Indian National Congress State-In-Charge of Arunachal Pradesh, Meghalaya and Mizoram
2024–Present	President, West Bengal Pradesh Congress Committee
