= Kshiti Goswami =

Indian politician (1943–2019)

General Secretary of the Revolutionary Socialist Party
- In office 2018–2019
- Preceded by: T. J. Chandrachoodan
- Succeeded by: Manoj Bhattacharya

Minister of Public Works Department, Government of West Bengal
- In office 1996–2001
- In office 2006–2011

Member of West Bengal Legislative Assembly
- In office 19 June 1991 – 13 May 2001
- Preceded by: Jatin Chakraborty
- Succeeded by: Saugata Roy
- Constituency: Dhakuria
- In office 11 May 2006 – 13 May 2011
- Preceded by: Saugata Roy
- Succeeded by: Constituency Dissolved
- Constituency: Dhakuria

Personal details
- Born: 24 January 1943
- Died: 24 November 2019 (aged 76)
- Party: Revolutionary Socialist Party

Kshiti Goswami (24 January 1943 – 24 November 2019) was an Indian politician from West Bengal belonging to Revolutionary Socialist Party. He was a member of the West Bengal Legislative Assembly. He was a minister of West Bengal Government as well. He also served as the secretary of Revolutionary Socialist Party's state unit and general secretary of Revolutionary Socialist Party's central committee.

== Biography ==
Goswami was elected as a member of the West Bengal Legislative Assembly from Dhakuria in 1991. He was also elected from Dhakuria in 1996. He was elected again from Dhakuria in 2006.

Goswami was a minister of the West Bengal Government. He served as Public Works Department Minister of West Bengal Government from 1996 to 2001 and 2006 to 2011. He also served as the secretary of Revolutionary Socialist Party's state unit and general secretary of Revolutionary Socialist Party's central committee.

Goswami died on 24 November 2019 at the age of 76.

== Electoral History ==
=== Legislative Assembly ===
Year	Constituency	Party	Votes	%	Opponent	Party	Votes	%	Result	Margin	%
2011	Alipurduars	RSP	72,822	42.10	Debaprasad Roy	INC	79,605	46.02	Lost	-6,783	-3.92
2006	Dhakuria	RSP	57,669	47.73	Sougata Roy	AITC	56,582	46.83	Won	+1,087	+0.90
2001	Dhakuria	RSP	57,427	45.31	Sougata Roy	AITC	62,059	48.97	Lost	-4,632	-3.66
1996	Dhakuria	RSP	66,593	49.15	Sukhendu Shekhar Roy	INC	59,542	43.95	Won	+7,051	+5.20
1991	Dhakuria	RSP	53,692	45.35	Jatin Chakravorty	IND	40,426	34.14	Won	+13,266	+11.21
