= All India Insurance Employees Association =

Indian trade union

AIIEA
- All India Insurance Employees Association
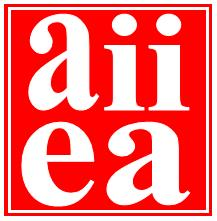
- Founded: 1951
- Headquarters: LIC Buildings, Secretariat Road, Hyderabad 500 063, India
- Location: India
- Members: 110000
- Key people: Com.Varadan Ramesh (President); Com.Sreekanth Mishra (General Secretary)

The All India Insurance Employees Association (AIIEA) is a trade union in the life and general insurance public sector of India. The AIIEA was formed in July 1951 and its inaugural convention was held at Dhuru Hall of Dadar, Bombay, on 30 June – 1 July 1951. It is politically a left-oriented organisation.

== Membership and achievements ==
When the AIIEA was formed, its membership was in the hundreds. Now it has a membership of over 100,000 with eight zonal units, 101 divisional units, and 2048 branch units throughout India. There are several female union office bearers at the branch, divisional, zonal and national levels; female membership exceeds 40%.

In its 60 years of existence it has resisted the privatization of public sector insurance companies, pension agreements and Mediclaim subsidies for both existing and retired employees.

== Leaders ==
SZIEF is among the leading zonal units of AIIEA led by K. Swaminathan and Kunhikrishnan. ICEU Thanjavur Division is one of the leading divisional units of AIIEA, led in the past by R. Govindarajan, K. Sreenivasan, K. Lakshmanan, and S.R. Krishnamurthy. It is now led by R. Punniamurthy and S. Selvaraj.
