= Maniktala Assembly constituency =

Constituency of the West Bengal Legislative Assembly, in India

Maniktala
- Constituency No. 167 for the West Bengal Legislative Assembly
- Interactive Map Outlining Maniktala Assembly Constituency

Constituency details
- Country: India
- Region: East India
- State: West Bengal
- District: Kolkata
- Lok Sabha constituency: Kolkata Uttar
- Established: 1951
- Total electors: 211,214
- Reservation: None

Member of Legislative Assembly
- 18th West Bengal Legislative Assembly
- Incumbent Tapas Roy
- Party: Bharatiya Janata Party
- Alliance: NDA
- Elected year: 2026

Maniktala Assembly constituency is a Legislative Assembly constituency of Kolkata district in the Indian state of West Bengal.

== Overview ==
As per order of the Delimitation Commission in respect of the Delimitation of constituencies in the West Bengal, Maniktala Assembly constituency is composed of the following:

- Ward Nos. 11, 12, 13, 14, 15, 16, 31 and 32 of Kolkata Municipal Corporation.

Borough	Ward No.	Councillor	2021 Winner
II	11	Atin Ghosh	Trinamool Congress
II	12	Meenakshi Gangopadhyay	Trinamool Congress
III	13	Anindya Kishor Routh	Trinamool Congress
III	14	Amal Chakraborty	Trinamool Congress
II	15	Sukhla Bhore	Trinamool Congress
II	16	Swapan Kumar Das	Trinamool Congress
III	31	Paresh Paul	Trinamool Congress
III	32	Shanti Ranjan Kundu	Trinamool Congress

Maniktala Assembly constituency is part of No. 24 Kolkata Uttar Lok Sabha constituency.

== Members of the Legislative Assembly ==
Year	Name	Party
1952	Ranendra Nath Sen	Communist Party of India
1957	Ranendra Nath Sen	Communist Party of India
1962	Ila Mitra	Communist Party of India
1967	Ila Mitra	Communist Party of India
1969	Ila Mitra	Communist Party of India
1971	Anila Debi	Communist Party of India (Marxist)
1972	Ila Mitra	Communist Party of India
1977	Suhrid Mullick Chowdhury	Communist Party of India (Marxist)
1982	Shyamal Chakraborty	Communist Party of India (Marxist)
1987	Shyamal Chakraborty	Communist Party of India (Marxist)
1991	Shyamal Chakraborty	Communist Party of India (Marxist)
1996	Paresh Paul	Indian National Congress
2001	Paresh Paul	Trinamool Congress
2006	Rupa Bagchi	Communist Party of India (Marxist)
2011	Sadhan Pande	Trinamool Congress
2016	Sadhan Pande	Trinamool Congress
2021	Sadhan Pande	Trinamool Congress
2024^	Supti Pandey	Trinamool Congress
2026	Tapas Roy	Bharatiya Janata Party

- denotes by-election

== Election results ==
=== 2026 ===
2026 West Bengal Legislative Assembly election: Maniktala
Party	Candidate	Votes	%	±%
BJP	Tapas Roy	76,370	50.67	▲15.07
AITC	Shrreya Pande	60,726	40.29	▼10.53
CPI	Mousumi Ghosh	9,014	5.98	
INC	Sugato Roy Chowdhury	1,426	0.95	
NOTA	None of the above	1,058	0.7	▼0.37
Majority		15,644	10.38	▼4.84
Turnout		150,722	90.82	▲27.89
BJP gain from AITC		Swing		

=== 2024 bypoll ===
2024 West Bengal Assembly by election : Maniktala
Party	Candidate	Votes	%	±%
AITC	Supti Pandey	83,110	71.65	+20.83
BJP	Kalyan Chaubey	20,798	17.93	−17.67
CPI(M)	Rajib Majumder	9,502	8.19	−1.97
NOTA	None of the above	1,023	0.88	−0.19
Majority		62,312	53.72	62,312
Turnout		1,15,991	53.7	−9.29
AITC hold		Swing		

The seat fell vacant due to the death of sitting MLA Sadhan Pande on 20th February 2022. However, bypolls to the seat couldn't be held even after 6 months of Pande's death (according to Indian law) because BJP candidate Kalyan Chaubey filed an election petition in the Calcutta High Court alleging irregularities in polling & demanded a recount of votes. The Representation of the People Act, 1951 forbids holding any polls to the seat until any election petition concerning that seat hasn't been resolved at the court. On 29 April 2024, Choubey withdrew his election petition from the court, making way for bypoll to the seat.

=== 2021 ===
2021 West Bengal Legislative Assembly election: Maniktala
Party	Candidate	Votes	%	±%
AITC	Sadhan Pande	67,577	50.82	
BJP	Kalyan Chaubey	47,339	35.6	
CPI(M)	Rupa Bagchi	13,513	10.16	
NOTA	None of the above	1,420	1.07	
Majority		20,238	15.22	
Turnout		132,967	62.93	
AITC hold		Swing		

=== 2016 ===
2016 West Bengal Legislative Assembly election: Maniktala
Party	Candidate	Votes	%	±%
AITC	Sadhan Pande	73,157	50.60	−9.45
CPI(M)	Rajib Majumder	47,846	33.09	−2.31
BJP	Sunil Roy	18,149	12.55	+10.08
NOTA	None of the above	3,141	2.17	New
IND	Tarun Banerjee	920	0.64	
Majority		25,311	17.51	−7.14
Turnout		1,44,587	69.70	−3.27
AITC hold		Swing	-9.45	

=== 2011 ===
2011 West Bengal Legislative Assembly election: Maniktala
Party	Candidate	Votes	%	±%
AITC	Sadhan Pande	89,039	60.05	
CPI(M)	Rupa Bagchi	52,489	35.40	
BJP	Nandalal Singhania	3,663	2.47	
IND	Sanjay Bagchi	1,016	0.69	
Majority		36,550	24.65	
Turnout		1,48,273	72.97	
AITC win				
