= West Bengal Pradesh Congress Committee =

West Bengal Pradesh Congress Committee পশ্চিমবঙ্গ প্রদেশ কংগ্রেস কমিটি
- President: Subhankar Sarkar
- Founded: 19 June 1966 (60 years ago)
- Headquarters: Bidhan Bhavan, Sealdah, Entally, Kolkata, West Bengal, 700014
- Newspaper: Congress Barta
- Student wing: West Bengal State Chhatra Parishad
- Ideology: Social democracy
- Political position: Centre-left
- ECI status: A State Unit of Indian National Congress
- Alliance: Indian National Developmental Inclusive Alliance (National level)
- Seats in Rajya Sabha: 0 / 16
- Seats in Lok Sabha: 1 / 42
- Seats in West Bengal Legislative Assembly: 2 / 294
- Seats in Gorkhaland Territorial Administration: 0 / 62

Election symbol

Website
- wbpcc.org

The West Bengal Pradesh Congress Committee (WBPCC), formerly known as the Bengal Provincial Congress Committee in Colonial India, is the unit of the Indian National Congress for the state of West Bengal. It is responsible for the organization and management of the party's activities and campaigns in the state, as well as selecting candidates for local, state, and national elections.

== Structure and composition ==
S.no	Name	Designation
1.	Prakash Joshi	AICC State Incharge; AICC General Secretary
2.	Amba Prasad	AICC State Co Incharge; AICC Secretary
3.	Shashi Panna	State Incharge; West Bengal Adivasi Congress & National Coordinator All India Adivasi Congress, AICC
4.	Subhankar Sarkar	President; West Bengal Pradesh Congress Committee
5.		State Incharge; Rajiv Gandhi Panchayati Raj Sangathan
6.	Eshan Ahmed Khan	State Incharge; West Bengal Pradesh Youth Congress
7.	Shrabanti Singh	President; West Bengal Pradesh Mahila Congress
8.	Navaneeta Tirkey	Chairperson; West Bengal Pradesh Adivasi Congress
9.	Priyanka Choudhary	President; West Bengal State Chhatra Parishad NSUI
10.	Rahul Pandey	President; West Bengal Pradesh Congress Seva Dal

== List of presidents ==
S.no	President	Portrait	Term		Duration
1	Ananda Gopal Mukherjee		1981	1985	4 years, 0 days
2	Priya Ranjan Dasmunsi		1985	1989	4 years, 0 days
3	Siddhartha Shankar Ray		1989	1992	3 years, 0 days
4	Somendra Nath Mitra		1992	1998	6 years, 0 days
5	A. B. A. Ghani Khan Choudhury		20 July 1998	22 August 2000	2 years, 33 days
6	Pranab Mukherjee		22 August 2000	17 February 2008	7 years, 179 days
(2)	Priya Ranjan Dasmunsi		17 February 2008	23 October 2008	249 days
7	Manas Bhunia		23 October 2008	17 January 2011	2 years, 86 days
8	Pradip Bhattacharya		17 January 2011	10 February 2014	3 years, 24 days
9	Adhir Ranjan Chowdhury		11 February 2014	22 September 2018	4 years, 223 days
(4)	Somendra Nath Mitra		22 September 2018	30 July 2020	1 year, 312 days
(9)	Adhir Ranjan Chowdhury		9 September 2020	21 September 2024	4 years, 12 days
10	Subhankar Sarkar		21 September 2024	Incumbent	2 years, 58 days

== List of chief ministers of West Bengal from Indian National Congress ==
As of 2025, there have been five chief ministers of West Bengal from the Congress:

S.no	Name	Portrait	Term		
1.	Prafulla Chandra Ghosh		15 August 1947	22 January 1948	250 days
1.	Prafulla Chandra Ghosh		21 November 1967	19 February 1968	250 days
2.	Bidhan Chandra Roy		23 January 1948	1 July 1962	14 years, 159 days
3.	Prafulla Chandra Sen	Photographic portrait of Prafulla Chandra Sen	9 July 1962	28 February 1967	4 years, 234 days
4.	Ajoy Kumar Mukherjee	Photographic portrait of Ajoy Kumar Mukherjee	2 April 1971	28 June 1971	87 days
5.	Siddhartha Shankar Ray		20 March 1972	30 April 1977	5 years, 41 days

== Political history ==
The Indian National Congress was popular in West Bengal from India's independence in 1947 till the late 1970s. The party was voted out of power in 1977 due to the Emergency. After that, they played the role of the opposition during the Left Front regime. The party suffered a big blow when Mamata Banerjee left the Congress and founded the breakaway party of Trinamool Congress (TMC) in 1998. This led to exodus of the party members to the TMC and demise of the Congress Party in West Bengal. The party further declined due to the rise of the Bharatiya Janata Party in West Bengal in the mid 2010s, relegating the party to a mere fourth-party status in the state. In the Legislative Assembly election in 2021, the party drew blank for the first time and failed to win a single seat in the assembly.

== West Bengal Legislative Assembly election ==
Year	Assembly	Leader	Seats contested	Seats won	(+/-) in seats	% of votes	Vote swing	Popular vote	Outcome
1952	1st	Bidhan Chandra Roy	236	150 / 238	New entry	38.82%	New entry	28,89,994	Government
1957	2nd	Bidhan Chandra Roy	251	152 / 252	▲2	46.14%	▲7.32	48,30,992	Government
1962	3rd	Prafulla Chandra Sen	252	157 / 252	▲5	47.29%	▲1.15	45,22,476	Government
1967	4th	Prafulla Chandra Sen	280	127 / 280	▼30	41.13%	▼6.16	52,07,930	Opposition
1969	5th	Prafulla Chandra Sen	280	55 / 280	▼72	41.32%	▲0.19	55,38,622	Opposition
1971	6th	Abdus Sattar	239	105 / 280	▲50	29.19%	▼12.13	37,67,314	Government
1972	7th	Siddhartha Shankar Ray	238	216 / 280	▲111	49.08%	▲19.89	65,43,251	Government
1977	8th	Purabi Mukhopadhyay	290	20 / 294	▼196	23.02%	▼26.06	32,98,063	Opposition
1982	9th	Ananda Gopal Mukherjee	250	49 / 294	▲29	35.73%	▲12.71	80,35,272	Opposition
1987	10th	Priya Ranjan Dasmunsi	294	40 / 294	▼9	41.81%	▲6.08	1,09,89,520	Opposition
1991	11th	Siddhartha Shankar Ray	284	43 / 294	▲3	35.12%	▼6.69	1,08,75,834	Opposition
1996	12th	Somen Mitra	288	82 / 294	▲39	39.48%	▲4.36	1,45,23,964	Opposition
2001	13th	Pranab Mukherjee	60	26 / 294	▼56	7.98%	▼31.50	29,21,151	Opposition
2006	14th	Pranab Mukherjee	262	21 / 294	▼5	14.71%	▲6.73	58,05,398	Opposition
2011	15th	Pradip Bhattacharya	66	42 / 294	▲21	9.09%	▼5.62	43,30,580	Government
2016	16th	Adhir Ranjan Chowdhury	92	44 / 294	▲2	12.25%	▲3.16	67,00,938	Opposition
2021	17th	Adhir Ranjan Chowdhury	92	0 / 294	▼44	3.03%	▼9.22	18,27,169	Lost
2026	18th	Subhankar Sarkar	293	2 / 294	▲2	2.97%	▼0.06	19,00,942	Opposition

== Performance in General Elections ==
Lok Sabha Elections
Year	Lok Sabha	Seats contested	Seats won	(+/-) in seats	% of votes	Vote swing	Popular vote	Outcome
1951	1st	34	24 / 34	24	42.10%	New entry	32,05,162	Government
1957	2nd	35	23 / 36	▼1	48.20%	▲6.10	50,31,696	Government
1962	3rd	36	22 / 36	▼1	46.79%	▼1.41	45,53,677	Government
1967	4th	40	14 / 40	▼8	39.69%	▼7.10	51,05,170	Government
1971	5th	31	13 / 42	▼1	28.20%	▼11.49	36,87,665	Government
1977	6th	34	3 / 42	▼10	29.37%	▲1.17	43,12,418	Opposition
1980	7th	41	4 / 42	▲1	36.51%	▲7.14	75,00,578	Government
1984	8th	42	16 / 42	▲12	48.16%	▲11.65	1,22,27,863	Government
1989	9th	41	4 / 42	▼12	41.38%	▼6.78	1,31,00,945	Opposition
1991	10th	39	5 / 42	▲1	34.86%	▼6.52	1,08,34,675	Government
1996	11th	42	9 / 42	▲4	40.09%	▲5.23	1,47,11,538	Opposition
1998	12th	39	1 / 42	▼8	15.20%	▼24.89	55,51,456	Opposition
1999	13th	41	3 / 42	▲2	13.29%	▼1.91	46,88,932	Opposition
2004	14th	37	6 / 42	▲3	14.56%	▲1.27	53,85,754	Government
2009	15th	14	6 / 42	Steady	13.45%	▼1.11	57,49,051	Government
2014	16th	42	4 / 42	▼2	9.58%	▼3.87	49,46,911	Opposition
2019	17th	40	2 / 42	▼2	5.61%	▼3.97	32,10,491	Opposition
2024	18th	12	1 / 42	▼1	4.70%	▼0.91	28,27,055	Opposition

== See also ==
- Indian National Congress
- All India Congress Committee
- Congress Working Committee
- All India Mahila Congress
- Indian Youth Congress
- National Students Union of India
