= Sealdah Assembly constituency =

Former constituency of the West Bengal Legislative Assembly, in India

Coordinates: 22°34′05″N 88°22′19″E

Sealdah
- Former constituency No. 156 for the West Bengal Legislative Assembly

Constituency details
- Country: India
- Region: East India
- State: West Bengal
- District: Kolkata
- Lok Sabha constituency: Calcutta North East
- Established: 1951
- Abolished: 2011
- Reservation: None

Party-wise wins in Sealdah Assembly constituency
1. Indian National Congress (10) (76.9%)
2. Revolutionary Socialist Party (1) (7.69%)
3. Janata Party (1) (7.69%)
4. All India Trinamool Congress (1) (7.69%)

Sealdah Assembly constituency was a Legislative Assembly constituency of Kolkata district in the Indian state of West Bengal.

== Overview ==
As a consequence of the orders of the Delimitation Commission, Sealdah Assembly constituency ceases to exist from 2011.

It was part of Calcutta North East (Lok Sabha constituency).

== Members of the Legislative Assembly ==
Election Year	Name of M.L.A.	Party affiliation
1952	Pannalal Bose	Indian National Congress
1967	Pratap Chandra Chunder	Indian National Congress
1969	Jatin Chakraborty	Revolutionary Socialist Party
1971	Binoy Banerjee	Indian National Congress
1972	Somendra Nath Mitra	Indian National Congress
1977	Binoy Banerjee	Janata Party
1982	Somendra Nath Mitra	Indian National Congress
1987	Somendra Nath Mitra	Indian National Congress
1991	Somendra Nath Mitra	Indian National Congress
1996	Somendra Nath Mitra	Indian National Congress
2001	Somendra Nath Mitra	Indian National Congress
2006	Somendra Nath Mitra	Indian National Congress
2009^	Sikha Mitra	All India Trinamool Congress

== Results ==
=== 2009 Bye-election ===
A bye-election was held on 18 August 2009 following the resignation of the sitting MLA, Somen Mitra who was elected as MP In Parliament from Diamond Harbour (Lok Sabha constituency).Sikha Mitra of Trinamool Congress Defeated Prabir Deb of CPI.

}}

Bye election, 2009: Sealdah
Party	Candidate	Votes	%	±%
AITC	Sikha Mitra	23,324		
CPI	Prabir Deb	7,297		
Turnout		39,650	27.69	−6.7
Majority		16,027		
Swing to AITC from INC		Swing	+21.27	

=== 2006 ===
In the 2006 elections, Somendra Nath Mitra of INC defeated his nearest rival Prabir Deb of CPI

West Bengal assembly elections, 2006: Sealdah constituency
Party	Candidate	Votes	%	±%
INC	Somendra Nath Mitra	23,011		
CPI	Prabir Deb	10,252		
AITC	Dulaleswar Roy	5,091		
Independent	Tarun Kumar Kar	267		
Independent	Dayanand Prasad	219		
Independent	Swaraj Ranjan Bhattacharyya	215		
Independent	Pradyut Kumar Ghosh	159		
Independent	Dilip Tripathi	99		
Majority		12,759		
Turnout		393,13	69.90	
INC hold		Swing		

.# Swing calculated on Trinamool Congress+BJP vote percentages taken together in 2006.

=== 1977-2009 ===
In the 2009 by-election, necessitated by the election of sitting MLA, Somendra Nath Mitra, to the Parliament from the Diamond Harbour (Lok Sabha constituency), Shikha Mitra of Trinamool Congress won the Sealdah assembly seat. In the 2006, 2001, 1996, 1991, 1987 and 1982 state assembly elections Somendra Nath Mitra of Congress won the 156 Sealdah assembly seat defeating his nearest rivals Prabir Deb of CPI in 2006, Chanchal Ghosh of CPI in 2001, Arun Prakash Chatterjee of CPI in 1996, Ila Mitra of CPI in 1991, Nanda Gopal Bhattacharjee of CPI in 1987 and 1982. Binoy Banerjee of Janata Party had won the seat in 1977 defeating Amar Prasad Chakraborty of Forward Bloc.

=== 1967-1972 ===
Somendranath Mitra of Congress won in 1972. Benoy Banerjee of Congress won in 1971. Jatin Chakraborty of RSP won in 1969. Pratap Chandra Chunder of Congress won in 1967. Prior to that the Seadah seat was not there. There was a seat at Muchipara.
